= Aspergillus subg. Circumdati =

Scientific classification
- Kingdom: Fungi
- Division: Ascomycota
- Class: Eurotiomycetes
- Order: Eurotiales
- Family: Aspergillaceae
- Genus: Aspergillus
- Subgenus: Aspergillus subg. Circumdati; Gams et al. (1985)

Type species
- Aspergillus ochraceus

Subgenus of fungi

Circumdati is a subgenus of Aspergillus in the family Trichocomaceae.

== Taxonomy ==
The subgenus Circumdati contained 111 species in 2020.

- sect. Candidi
  - ser. Candidi
    - Aspergillus candidus
    - Aspergillus dobrogensis
    - Aspergillus campestris
    - Aspergillus taichungensis
    - Aspergillus subalbidus
    - Aspergillus pragensis
    - Aspergillus tritici
- sect. Circumdati
  - ser. Circumdati
    - Aspergillus affinis
    - Aspergillus auricomus
    - Aspergillus cretensis
    - Aspergillus melleus
    - Aspergillus muricatus
    - Aspergillus ochraceus
    - Aspergillus ostianus
    - Aspergillus pallidofulvus
    - Aspergillus sesamicola
    - Aspergillus westerdijkiae
    - Aspergillus westlandensis
  - ser. Steyniorum
    - Aspergillus elegans
    - Aspergillus insulicola
    - Aspergillus occultus
    - Aspergillus ochraceopetaliformis
    - Aspergillus plvericola
    - Aspergillus pseudoelegans
    - Aspergillus steynii
  - ser. Sclerotiorum
    - Aspergillus persii
    - Aspergillus sclreotiorum
    - Aspergillus bridgeri
    - Aspergillus salwaensis
    - Aspergillus subramanianii
    - Aspergillus pseudosclerotiorum
    - Aspergillus fresenii
    - Aspergillus roseoglobulosus
    - Aspergillus neobridgeri
- sect. Flavi
  - ser. Flavi
    - Aspergillus cerealis
    - Aspergillus austrwickii
    - Aspergillus aflatoxiformans
    - Aspergillus pipericola
    - Aspergillus minisclerotigenes
    - Aspergillus oryzae
    - Aspergillus flavus
    - Aspergillus sojae
    - Aspergillus parasiticus
    - Aspergillus novoparasiticus
    - Aspergillus arachidicola
    - Aspergillus transmontanensis
    - Aspergillus sergii
    - Aspergillus krugeri
    - Aspergillus mottae
    - Aspergillus subflavus
  - ser. Kitamyces
    - Aspergillus caelatus
    - Aspergillus pseudocaelatus
    - Aspergillus pseudotamarii
    - Aspergillus tamarii
  - ser. Bertholletiarum
    - Aspergillus bertholletiae
  - ser. Nomiarum
    - Aspergillus pseudonomiae
    - Aspergillus nomiae
    - Aspergillus luteovirescens
  - ser. Coremiiformes
    - Aspergillus togoensis
    - Aspergillus coremiiformis
  - ser. Alliacei
    - Aspergillus vandermerwei
    - Aspergillus alliaceus
    - Aspergillus neoalliaceus
    - Aspergillus lanosus
    - Aspergillus magaliesburgensis
  - ser. Leporum
    - Aspergillus aspearensis
    - Aspergillus leporis
    - Aspergillus hancockii
  - ser. Avenacei
    - Aspergillus avenaceus
- sect. Flavipedes
  - ser. Flavipedes
    - Aspergillus iizukae
    - Aspergillus capensis
    - Aspergillus flavipes
    - Aspergillus ardalensis
    - Aspergillus templicola
    - Aspergillus urmiensis
    - Aspergillus suttoniae
    - Aspergillus neoflavipes
    - Aspergillus micronesiensis
  - ser. Spelaei
    - Aspergillus movilensis
    - Aspergillus luppiae
    - Aspergillus spelaeus
    - Aspergillus polyporicola
  - ser. Olivimuriarum
    - Aspergillus olivimuriae
  - ser. Neonivei
    - Aspergillus neoniveus
- sect. Janorum
  - ser. Janorum
    - Aspergillus trisporus
    - Aspergillus brevijanus
    - Aspergillus janus
    - Aspergillus yunnanensis
- sect. Petersoniorum
  - ser. Petersoniorum
    - Aspergillus arenarioides
    - Aspergillus asclerogenus
    - Aspergillus petersonii
    - Aspergillus peyronelii
- sect. Robusti
  - ser. Robusti
    - Aspergillus robustus
- sect. Tannerorum
  - ser. Tannerorum
    - Aspergillus tanneri
- sect. Terrei
  - ser. Ambigui
    - Aspergillus ambiguus
    - Aspergillus microcysticus
  - ser. Nivei
    - Aspergillus allahabadii
    - Aspergillus carneus
    - Aspergillus niveus
    - Aspergillus neoindicus
    - Aspergillus bicephalus
    - Aspergillus iranicus
  - ser. Terrei
    - Aspergillus alabamensis
    - Aspergillus aureoterreus
    - Aspergillus citrinoterreus
    - Aspergillus floccosus
    - Aspergillus heldtiae
    - Aspergillus hortae
    - Aspergillus neoafricanus
    - Aspergillus pseudoterreus
    - Aspergillus terreus
