= Aspergillus pallidofulvus =

Scientific classification
- Kingdom: Fungi
- Division: Ascomycota
- Class: Eurotiomycetes
- Order: Eurotiales
- Family: Aspergillaceae
- Genus: Aspergillus
- Subgenus: Aspergillus subg. Circumdati
- Species: A. pallidofulvus

Binomial name
- Aspergillus pallidofulvus Visagie, Varga, Frisvad & Samson (2014)

Synonyms
- A. sulphureus var. minimus Nakazawa (1932)

Species of fungus

Aspergillus pallidofulvus is a species of fungus in the section Circumdati of the genus Aspergillus. It has been reported to produce aspergamide A, aspergamide B, notoamides, penicillic acid, mellein, 4-hydroxy mellein, xanthomegnin, viomellein, aspyrone, and neoaspergillic acid. Cycloechinulin has been reported from single isolates.
