= Aspergillus elegans =

Scientific classification
- Kingdom: Fungi
- Division: Ascomycota
- Class: Eurotiomycetes
- Order: Eurotiales
- Family: Aspergillaceae
- Genus: Aspergillus
- Species: A. elegans

Binomial name
- Aspergillus elegans Gasperini (1887)

Species of fungus

Aspergillus elegans is a species of fungus in the genus Aspergillus. It is from the Circumdati section. The species was first described in 1978.

== Growth and morphology ==
A. elegans has been cultivated on both Czapek yeast extract agar (CYA) plates and Malt Extract Agar Oxoid® (MEAOX) plates. The growth morphology of the colonies can be seen in the pictures below.

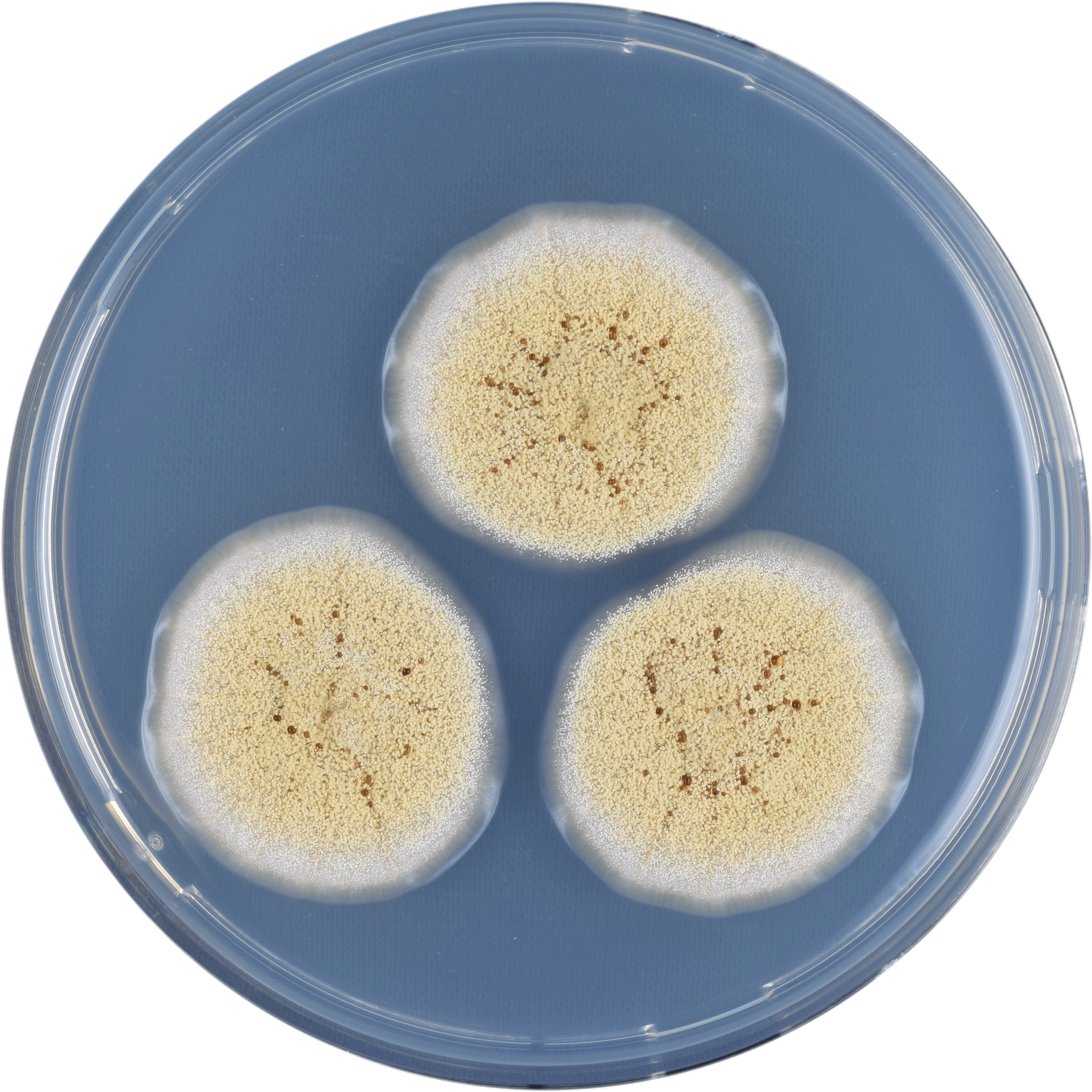
Aspergillus elegans growing on CYA plate

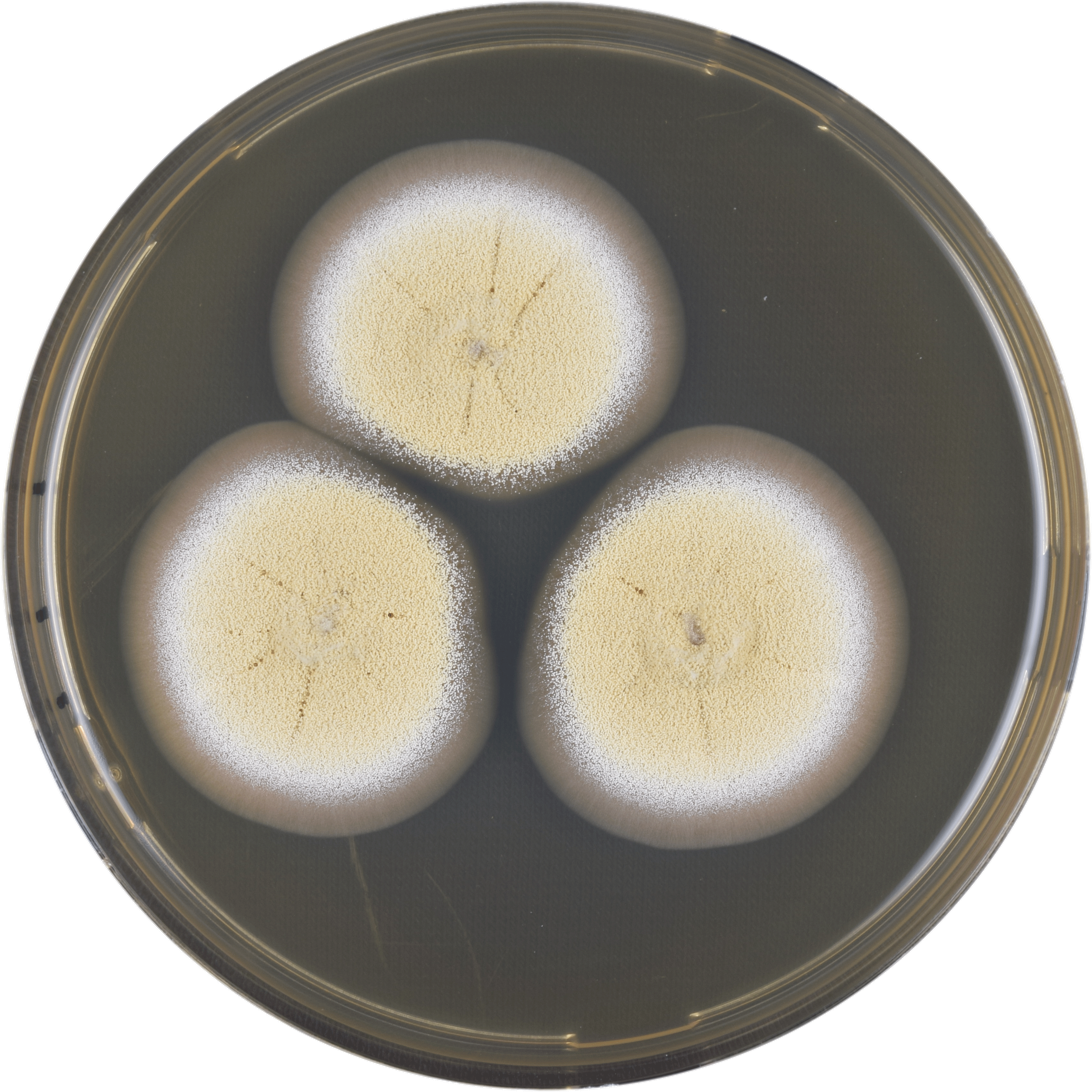
Aspergillus elegans growing on MEAOX plate
