= Aspergillus petersonii =

Scientific classification
- Kingdom: Fungi
- Division: Ascomycota
- Class: Eurotiomycetes
- Order: Eurotiales
- Family: Aspergillaceae
- Genus: Aspergillus
- Species: A. petersonii

Binomial name
- Aspergillus petersonii Ž. Jurjević & Hubka (2015)

Type strain
- CCF4947 = NRRL58502, CCF4999 = NRRL66216, CCF4944, CCF4945, CCF4946, CCF4948, CCF5101

Species of fungus

Aspergillus petersonii is a species of fungus in the genus Aspergillus which has been isolated from an office environment.
