= Aspergillus pragensis =

Scientific classification
- Kingdom: Fungi
- Division: Ascomycota
- Class: Eurotiomycetes
- Order: Eurotiales
- Family: Aspergillaceae
- Genus: Aspergillus
- Species: A. pragensis

Binomial name
- Aspergillus pragensis Hubka, Frisvad & M. Kolařík (2014)

Species of fungus

Aspergillus pragensis is a species of fungus in the genus Aspergillus. It is from the Candidi section. The species was first described in 2014. It has been reported to produce chlorflavonin, polar compound X, terphenyllin, 3-hydroxyterphenyllin, chlorflavonin, metabolite, 6-epi-stephacidin A, and terphenyllin.

== Growth and morphology ==
A. pragensis has been cultivated on both Czapek yeast extract agar (CYA) plates and Malt Extract Agar Oxoid® (MEAOX) plates. The growth morphology of the colonies can be seen in the pictures below.

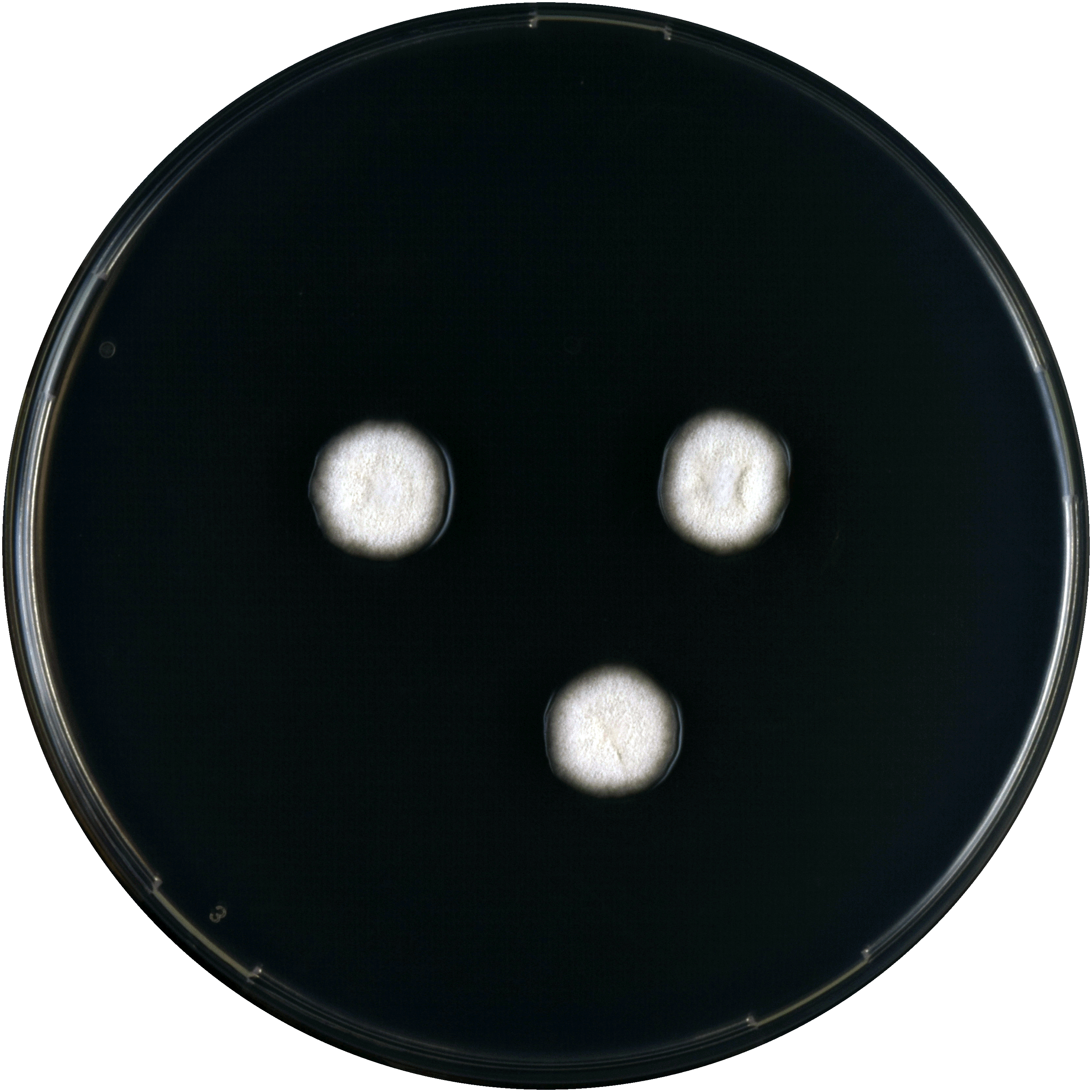
Aspergillus pragensis growing on CYA plate

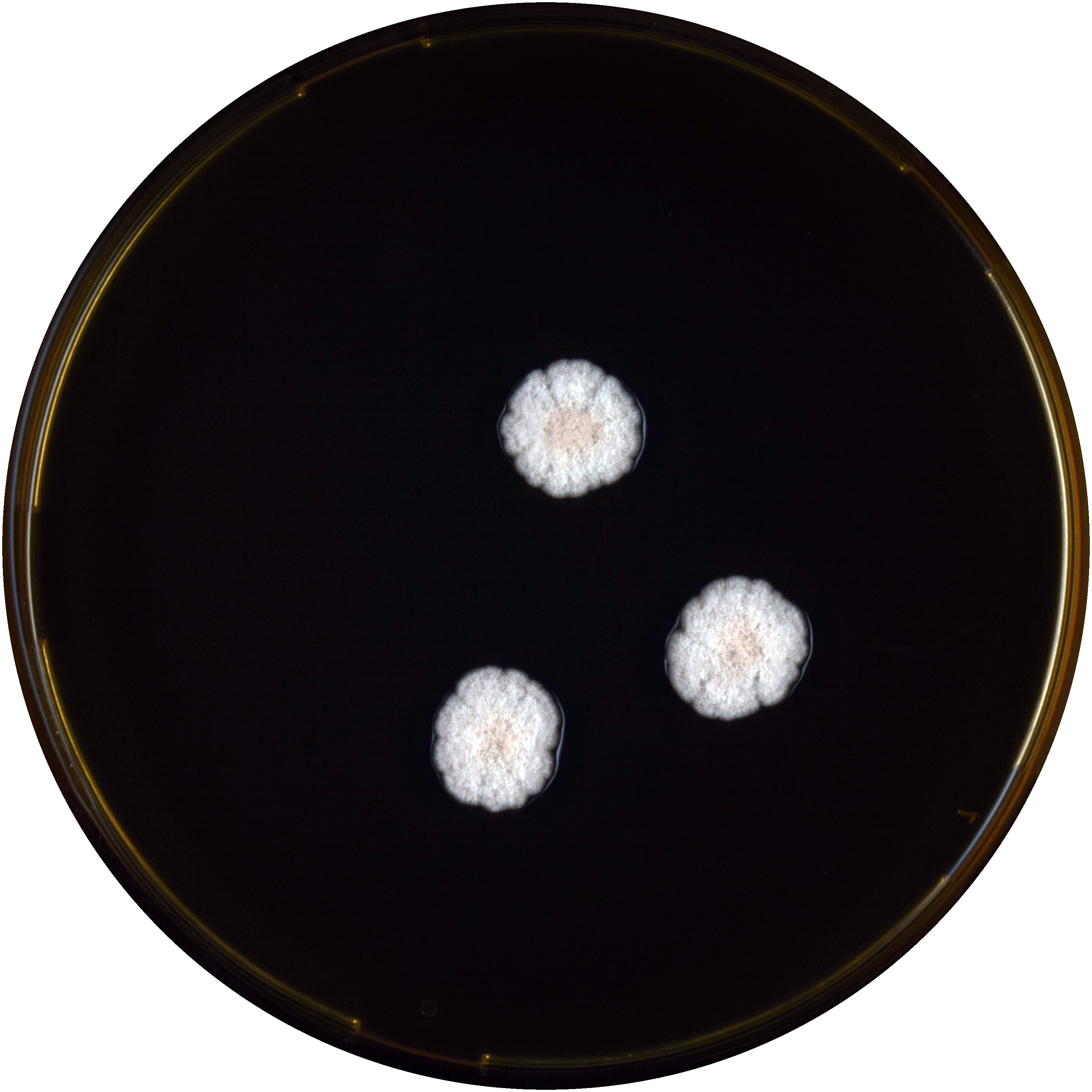
Aspergillus pragensis growing on MEAOX plate
