= Aspergillus aureoterreus =

Scientific classification
- Kingdom: Fungi
- Division: Ascomycota
- Class: Eurotiomycetes
- Order: Eurotiales
- Family: Aspergillaceae
- Genus: Aspergillus
- Species: A. aureoterreus

Binomial name
- Aspergillus aureoterreus Samson, S.W. Peterson, Frisvad & Varga (2011)

Species of fungus

Aspergillus aureoterreus is a species of fungus in the genus Aspergillus. It is from the Terrei section. The species was first described in 2011. It has been reported to produce citreoviridin.
