= Aspergillus sergii =

Scientific classification
- Kingdom: Fungi
- Division: Ascomycota
- Class: Eurotiomycetes
- Order: Eurotiales
- Family: Aspergillaceae
- Genus: Aspergillus
- Species: A. sergii

Binomial name
- Aspergillus sergii P. Rodrigues, S.W. Peterson, Venâncio & N. Lima

Species of fungus

Aspergillus sergii is a species of fungus in the genus Aspergillus first isolated from almonds and maize in Portugal. It is from the Flavi section. It has been reported to produce aflatoxin G, aflatoxin B, and cyclopiazonic acid.

== Growth and morphology ==
A. sergii has been cultivated on both Czapek yeast extract agar (CYA) plates and Malt Extract Agar Oxoid® (MEAOX) plates. The growth morphology of the colonies can be seen in the pictures below.

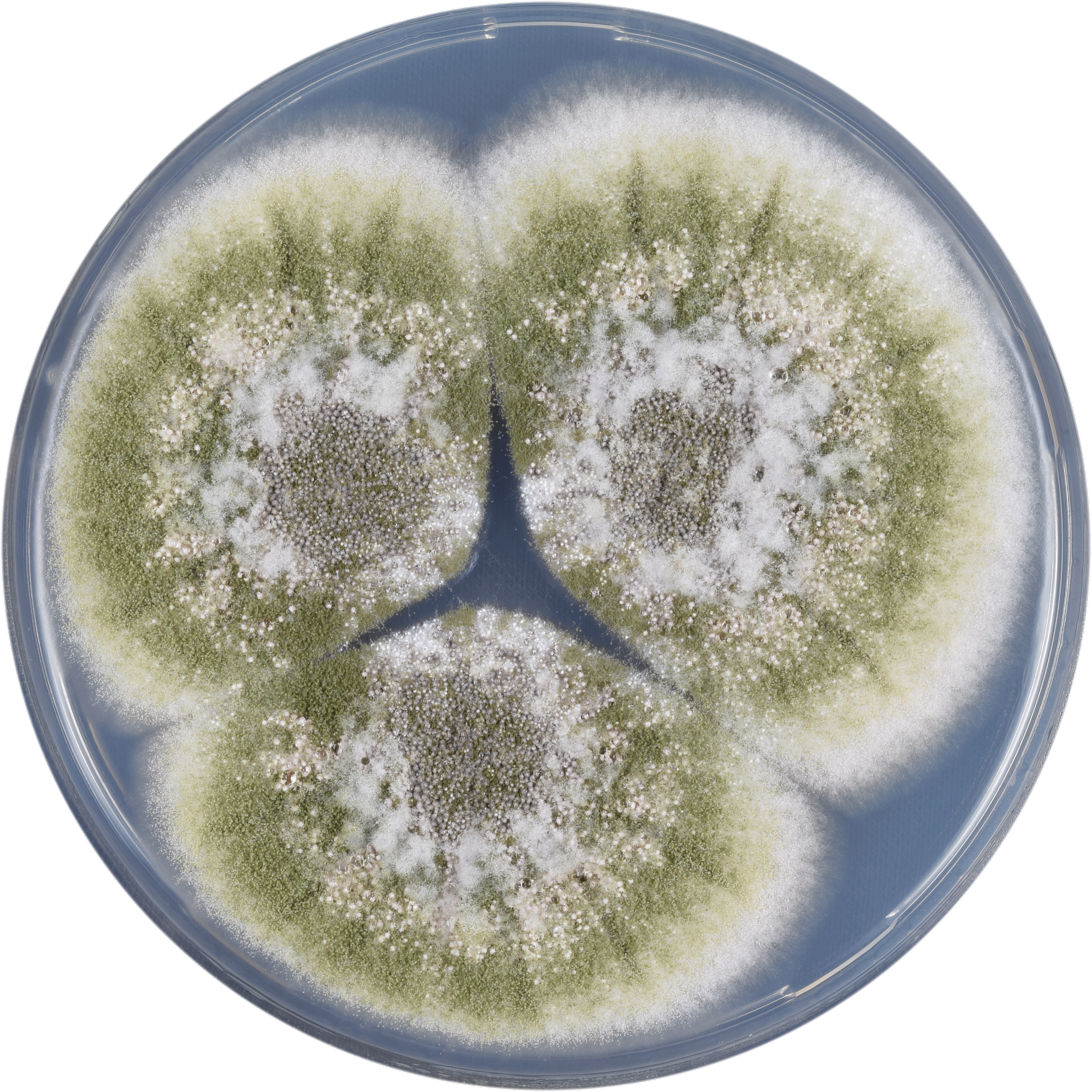
Aspergillus sergii growing on CYA plate

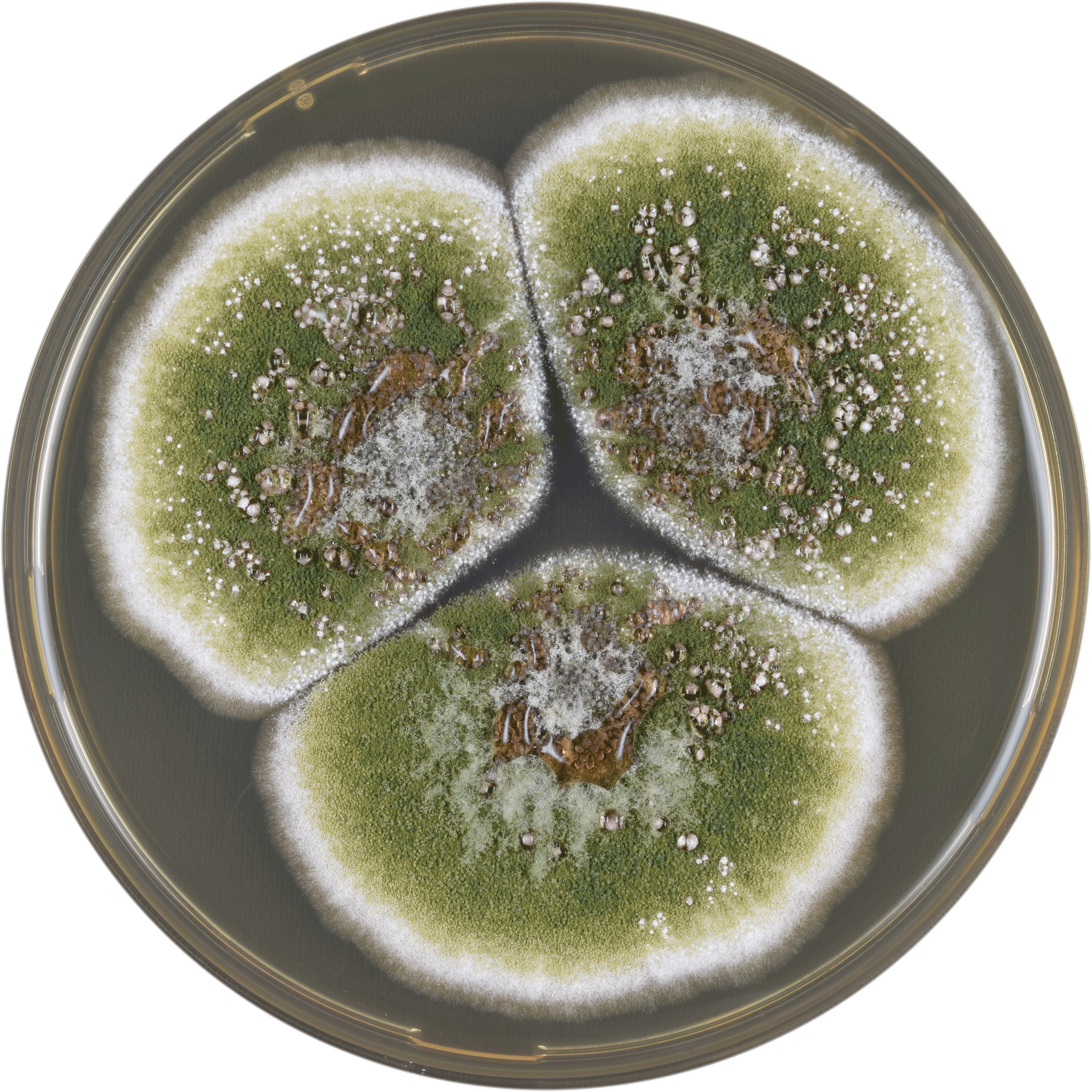
Aspergillus sergii growing on MEAOX plate
