= Aspergillus neoflavipes =

Scientific classification
- Kingdom: Fungi
- Division: Ascomycota
- Class: Eurotiomycetes
- Order: Eurotiales
- Family: Aspergillaceae
- Genus: Aspergillus
- Species: A. neoflavipes

Binomial name
- Aspergillus neoflavipes Hubka, A. Nováková, M. Kolařík, S.W. Peterson (2015)

Synonyms
- Fennellia flavipes B.J. Wiley & E.G. Simmons (1973)

Species of fungus

Aspergillus neoflavipes is a species of fungus in the genus Aspergillus. It is from the Flavipedes section. The species was first described in 2015.

== Growth and morphology ==
A. neoflavipes has been cultivated on both Czapek yeast extract agar (CYA) plates and Malt Extract Agar Oxoid (MEAOX) plates. The growth morphology of the colonies can be seen in the pictures below.

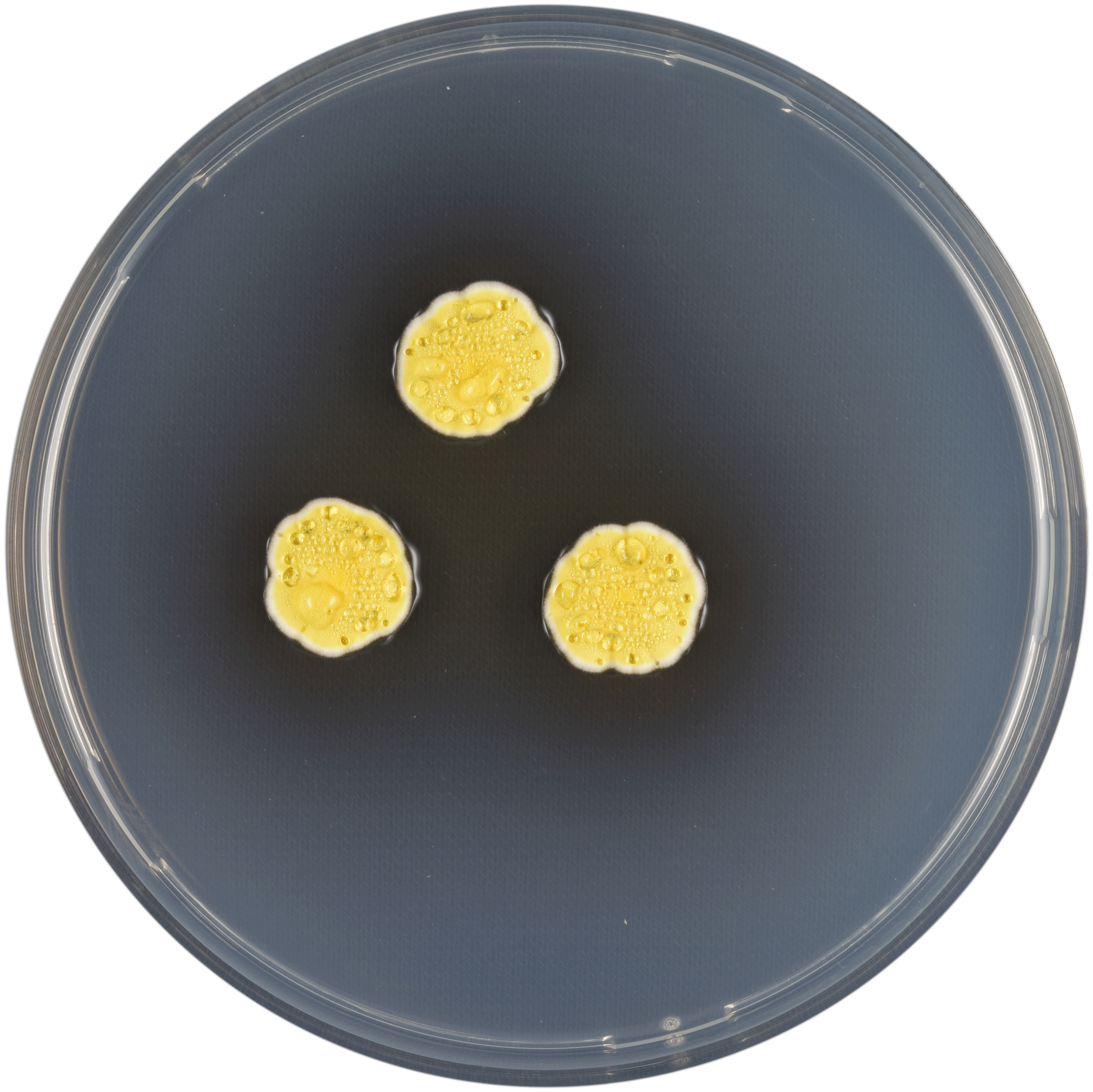
Aspergillus neoflavipes growing on CYA plate

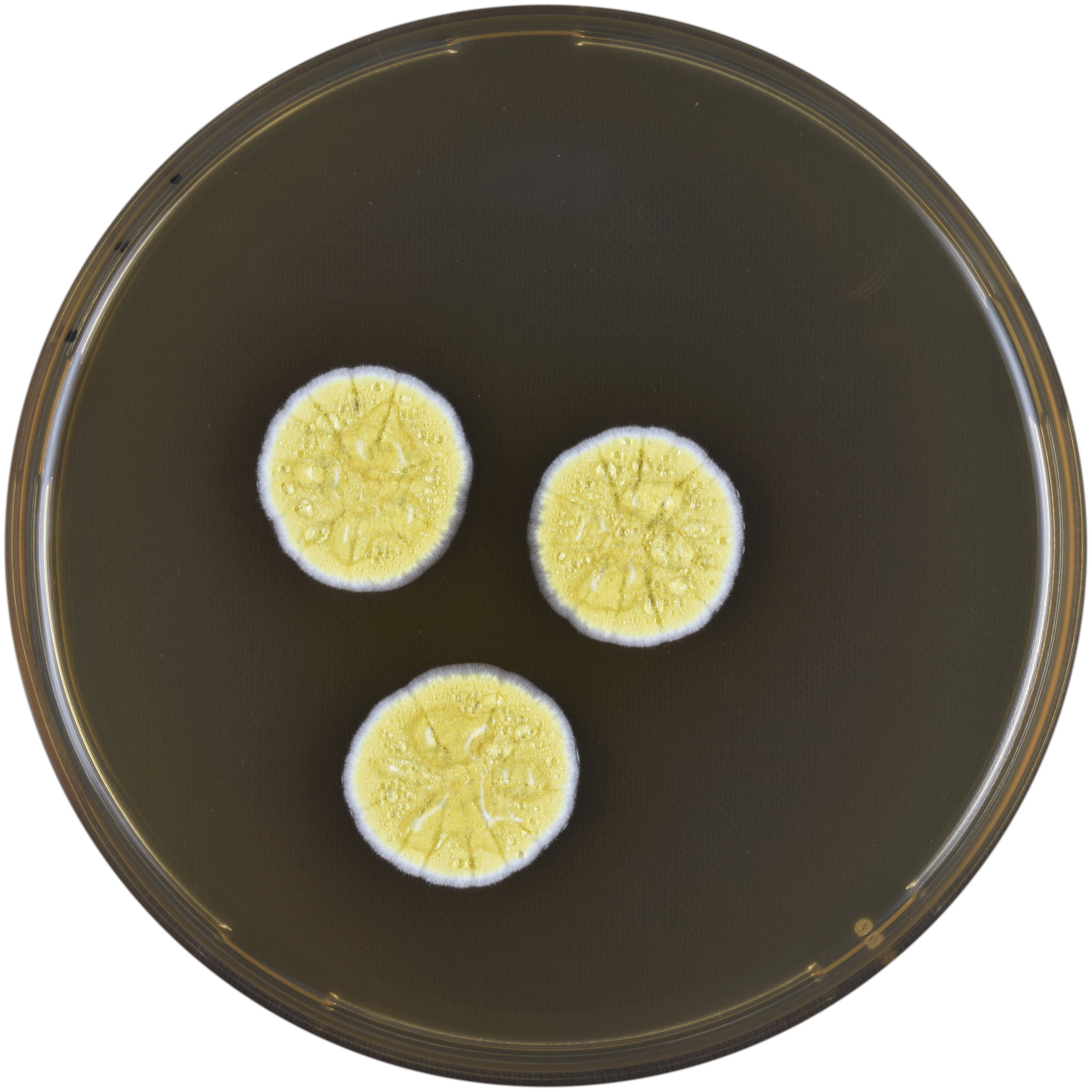
Aspergillus neoflavipes growing on MEAOX plate
