= Aspergillus mottae =

Scientific classification
- Kingdom: Fungi
- Division: Ascomycota
- Class: Eurotiomycetes
- Order: Eurotiales
- Family: Aspergillaceae
- Genus: Aspergillus
- Species: A. mottae

Binomial name
- Aspergillus mottae C. Soares, S.W. Peterson & Venâncio (2012)

Species of fungus

Aspergillus mottae is a species of fungus in the genus Aspergillus first isolated from almonds and maize in Portugal. It is from the Flavi section. The species was first described in 2012.

== Growth and morphology ==
A. mottae has been cultivated on both Czapek yeast extract agar (CYA) plates and Malt Extract Agar Oxoid® (MEAOX) plates. The growth morphology of the colonies can be seen in the pictures below.

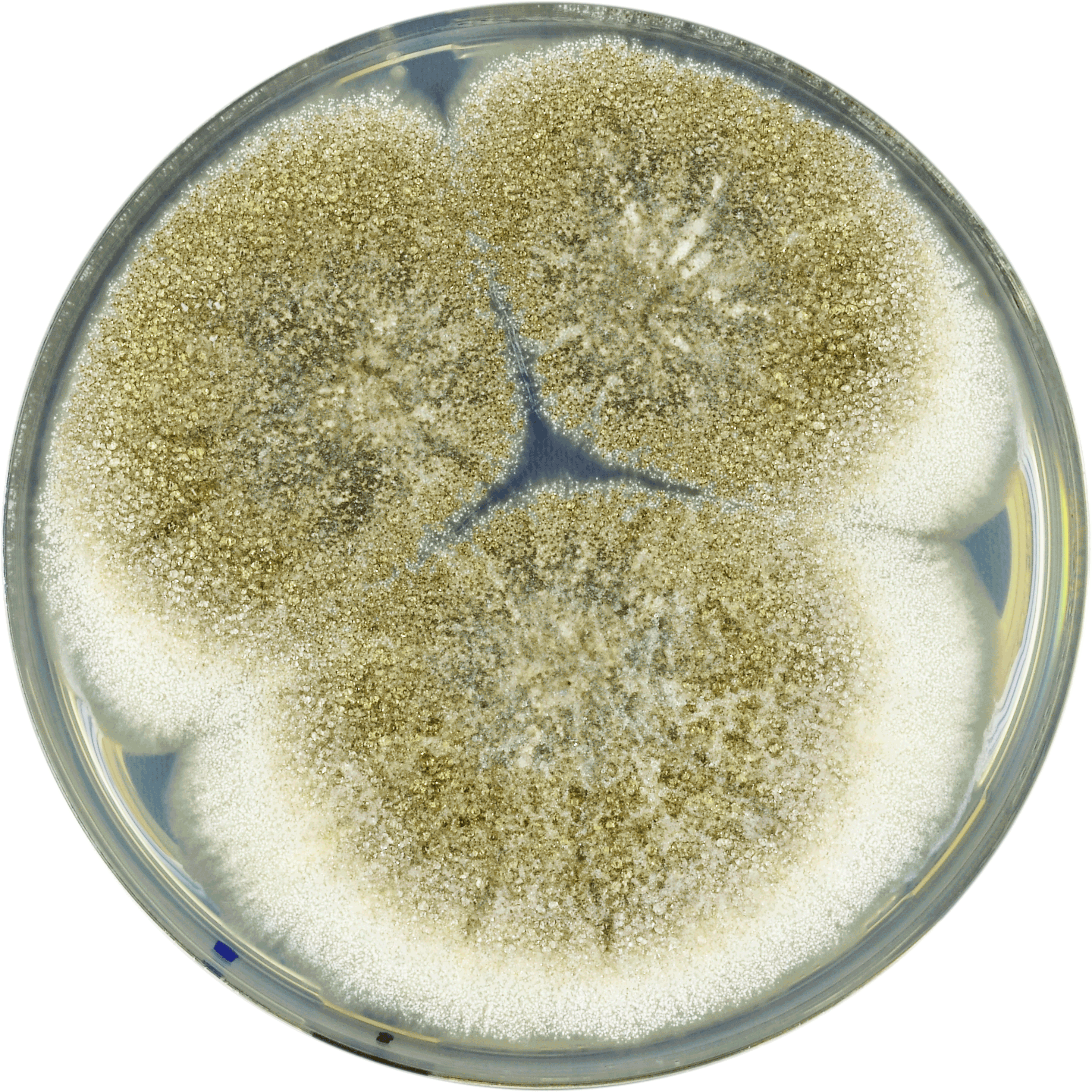
Aspergillus mottae growing on CYA plate

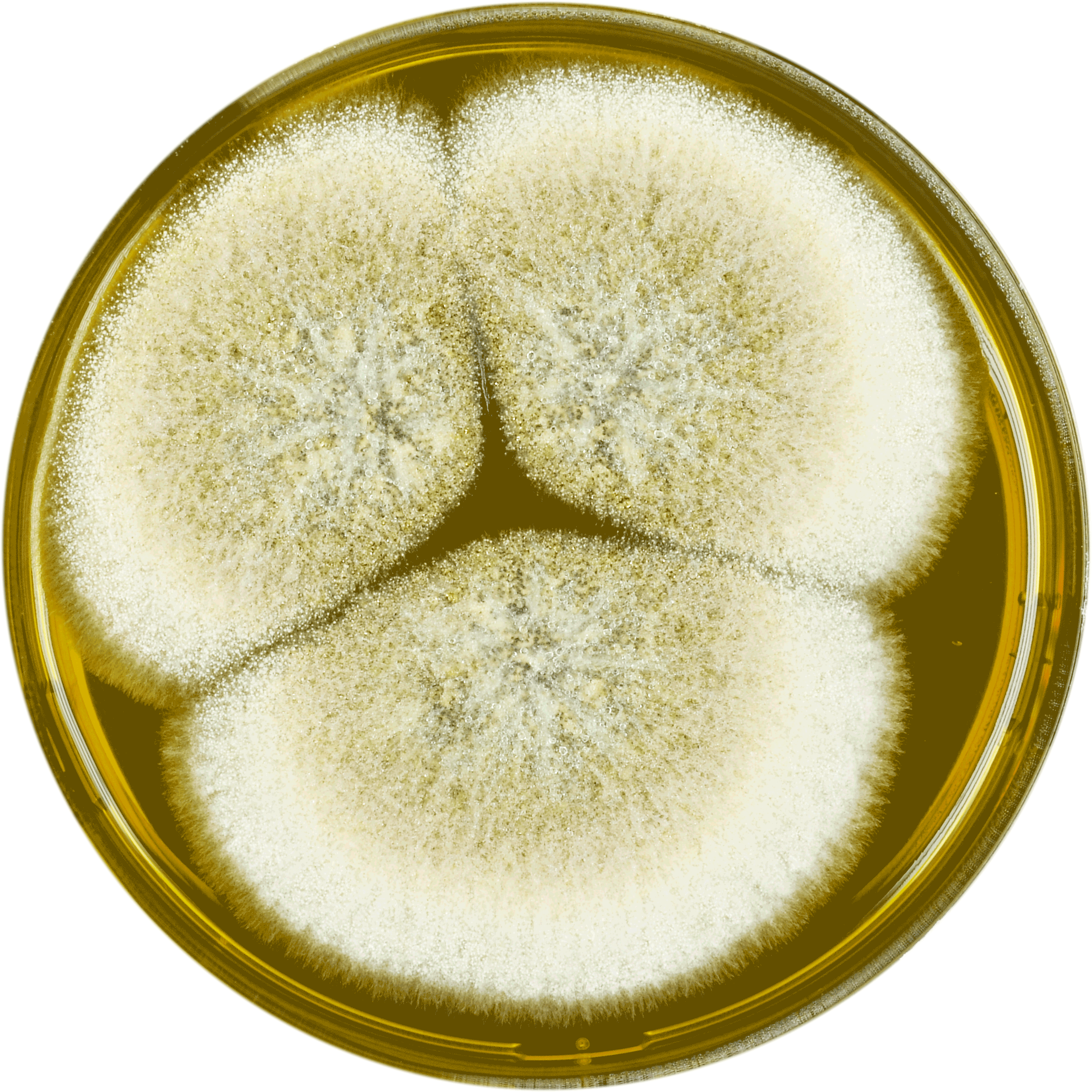
Aspergillus mottae growing on MEAOX plate
