= Aspergillus microcysticus =

Scientific classification
- Kingdom: Fungi
- Division: Ascomycota
- Class: Eurotiomycetes
- Order: Eurotiales
- Family: Aspergillaceae
- Genus: Aspergillus
- Species: A. microcysticus

Binomial name
- Aspergillus microcysticus Sappa (1955)

Type strain
- ATCC 16826, BCRC 33360, CBS 120.58, CCRC 33360, IMI 139275, NRRL 4749, QM 8158, WB 4749

Species of fungus

Aspergillus microcysticus is a species of fungus in the genus Aspergillus. Aspergillus microcysticus produces aspochalasin A, aspochalasin C, aspochalasin D, and the antibiotic asposterol.

== Growth and morphology ==
A. microcysticus has been cultivated on both Czapek yeast extract agar (CYA) plates and Malt Extract Agar Oxoid® (MEAOX) plates. The growth morphology of the colonies can be seen in the pictures below, where distinct differences in texture, coloration, and edge structure are evident depending on the medium used. These visual variations may reflect the organism's metabolic response to differing nutrient compositions, and can be useful for species identification or comparative analysis.

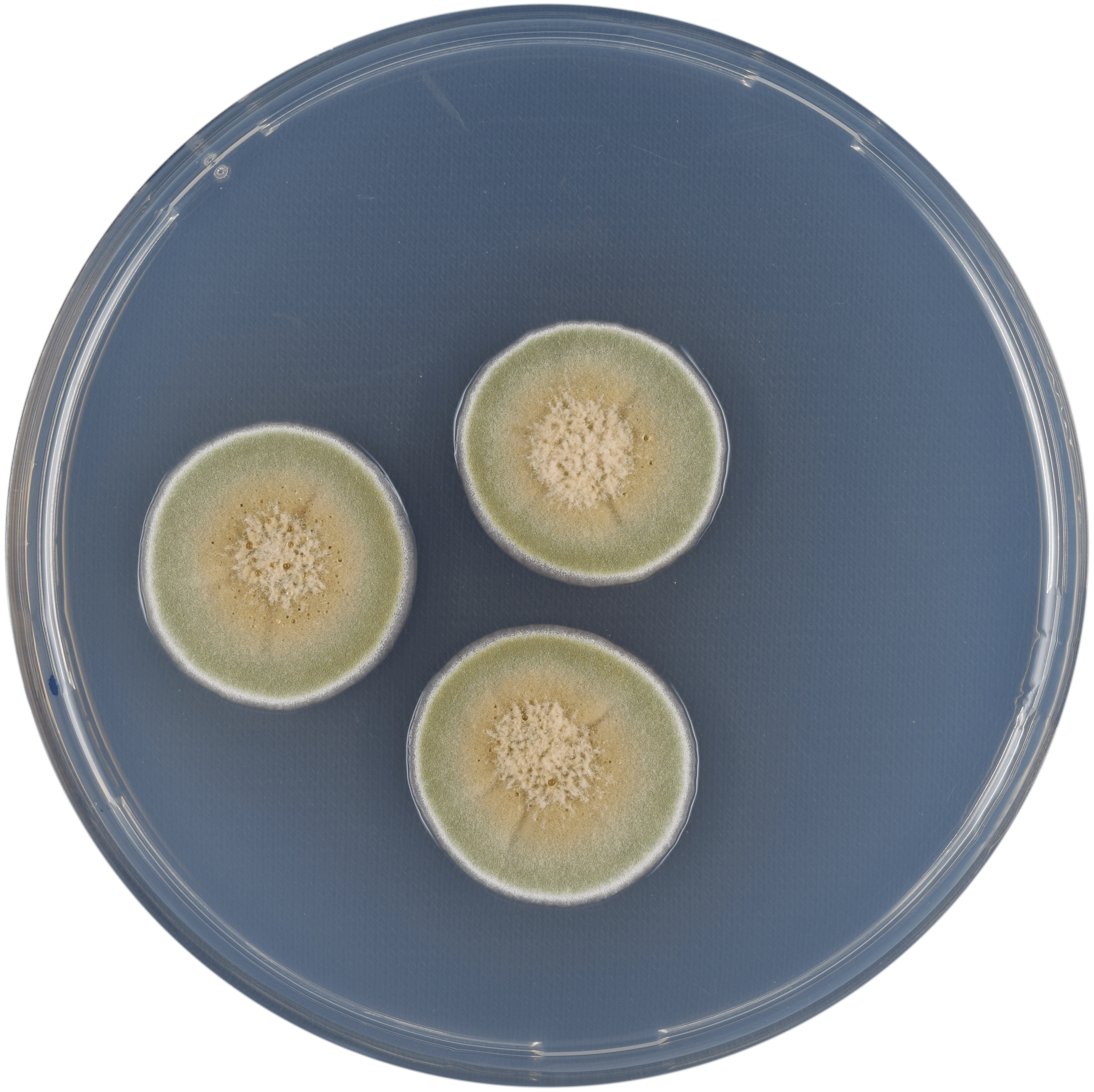
Aspergillus microcysticus growing on CYA plate

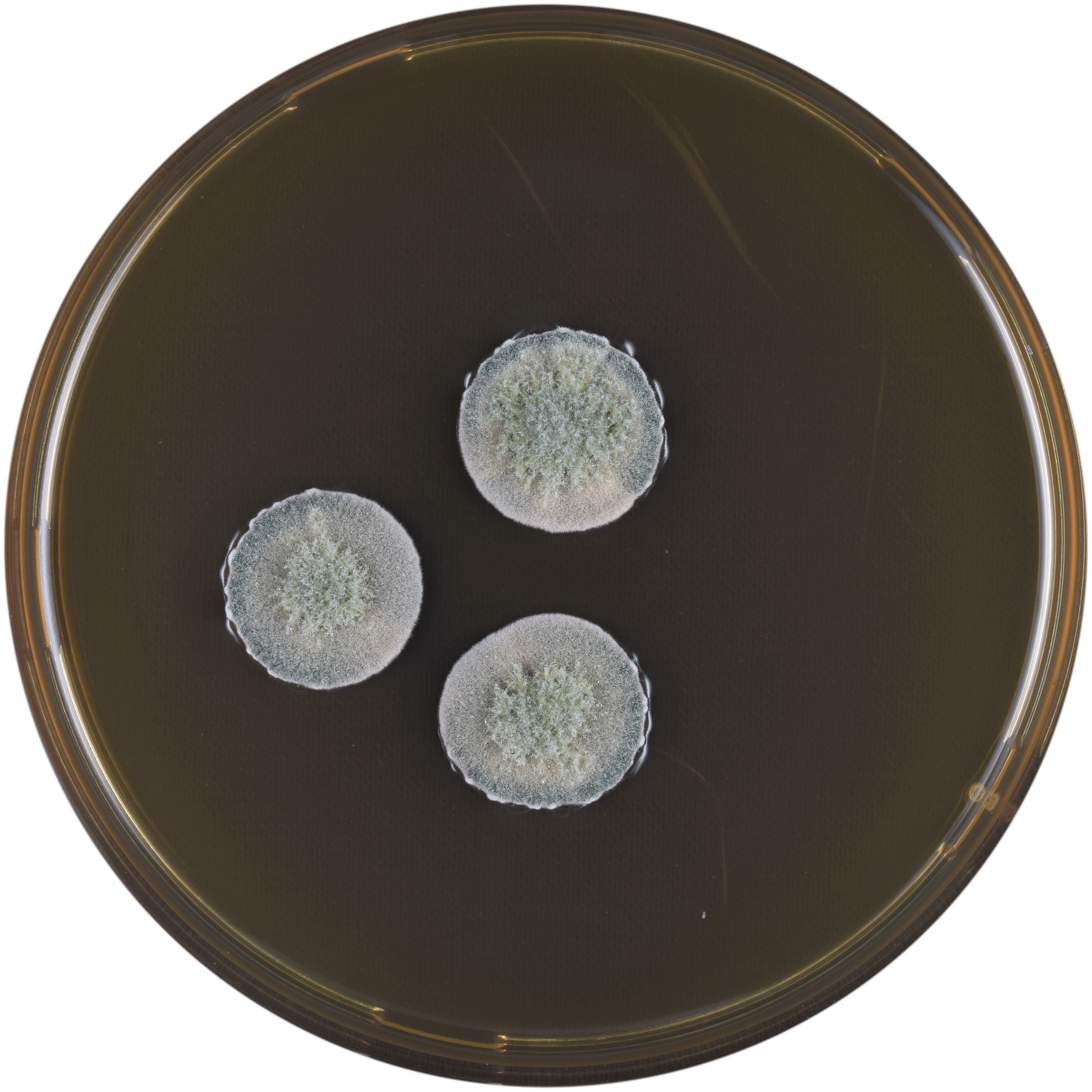
Aspergillus microcysticus growing on MEAOX plate
