= Aspergillus tanneri =

Scientific classification
- Kingdom: Fungi
- Division: Ascomycota
- Class: Eurotiomycetes
- Order: Eurotiales
- Family: Aspergillaceae
- Genus: Aspergillus
- Species: A. tanneri

Binomial name
- Aspergillus tanneri Kwon-Chung, Sugui & S. W. Peterson (2012)

Species of fungus

Aspergillus tanneri is a species of fungus in the genus Aspergillus. The species was first described in 2012.

== Growth and morphology ==
A. tanneri has been cultivated on both Czapek yeast extract agar (CYA) plates and Malt Extract Agar Oxoid® (MEAOX) plates. The growth morphology of the colonies can be seen in the pictures below.

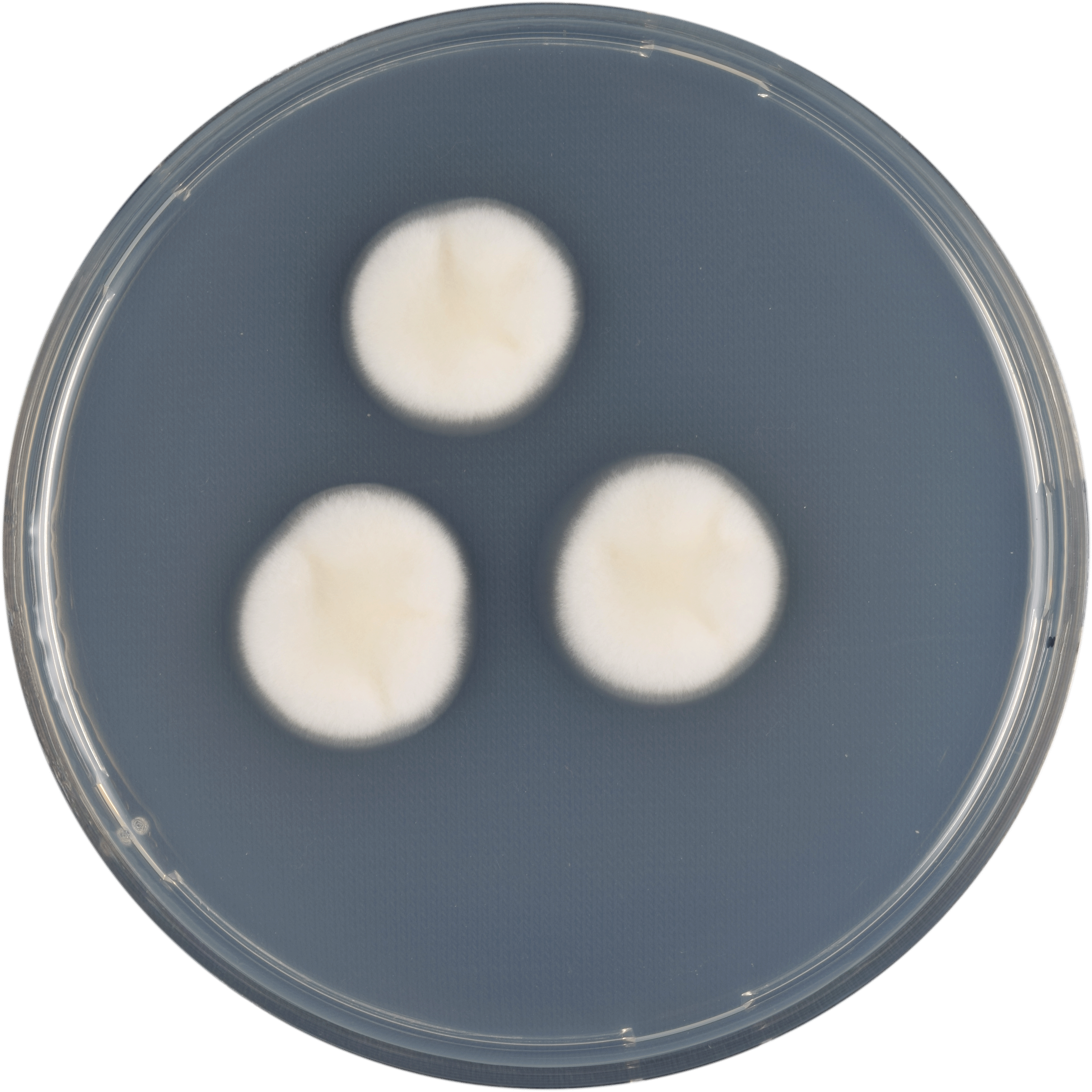
Aspergillus tanneri growing on CYA plate

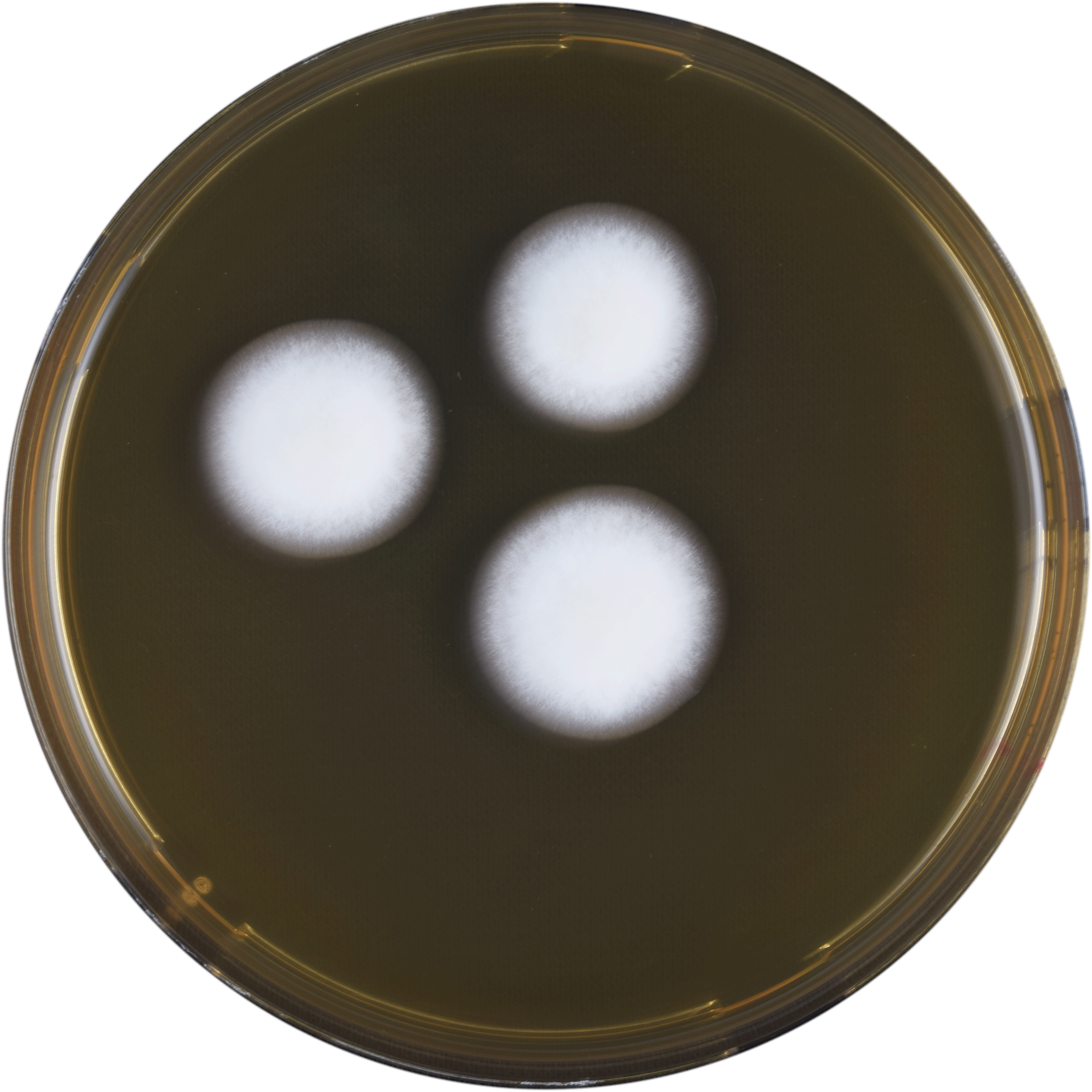
Aspergillus tanneri growing on MEAOX plate
