= Aspergillus allahabadii =

Scientific classification
- Kingdom: Fungi
- Division: Ascomycota
- Class: Eurotiomycetes
- Order: Eurotiales
- Family: Aspergillaceae
- Genus: Aspergillus
- Species: A. allahabadii

Binomial name
- Aspergillus allahabadii B.S. Mehrotra & Agnihotri (1962)

Species of fungus

Aspergillus allahabadii is a species of fungus in the genus Aspergillus. It is from the Terrei section. The species was first described in 1962. It has been reported to produce asperphenamate, atrovenetins, butyrolactones, citrinin, and gregatins.

== Growth and morphology ==
A. allahabadii has been cultivated on both Czapek yeast extract agar (CYA) plates and Malt Extract Agar Oxoid® (MEAOX) plates. The growth morphology of the colonies can be seen in the pictures below.

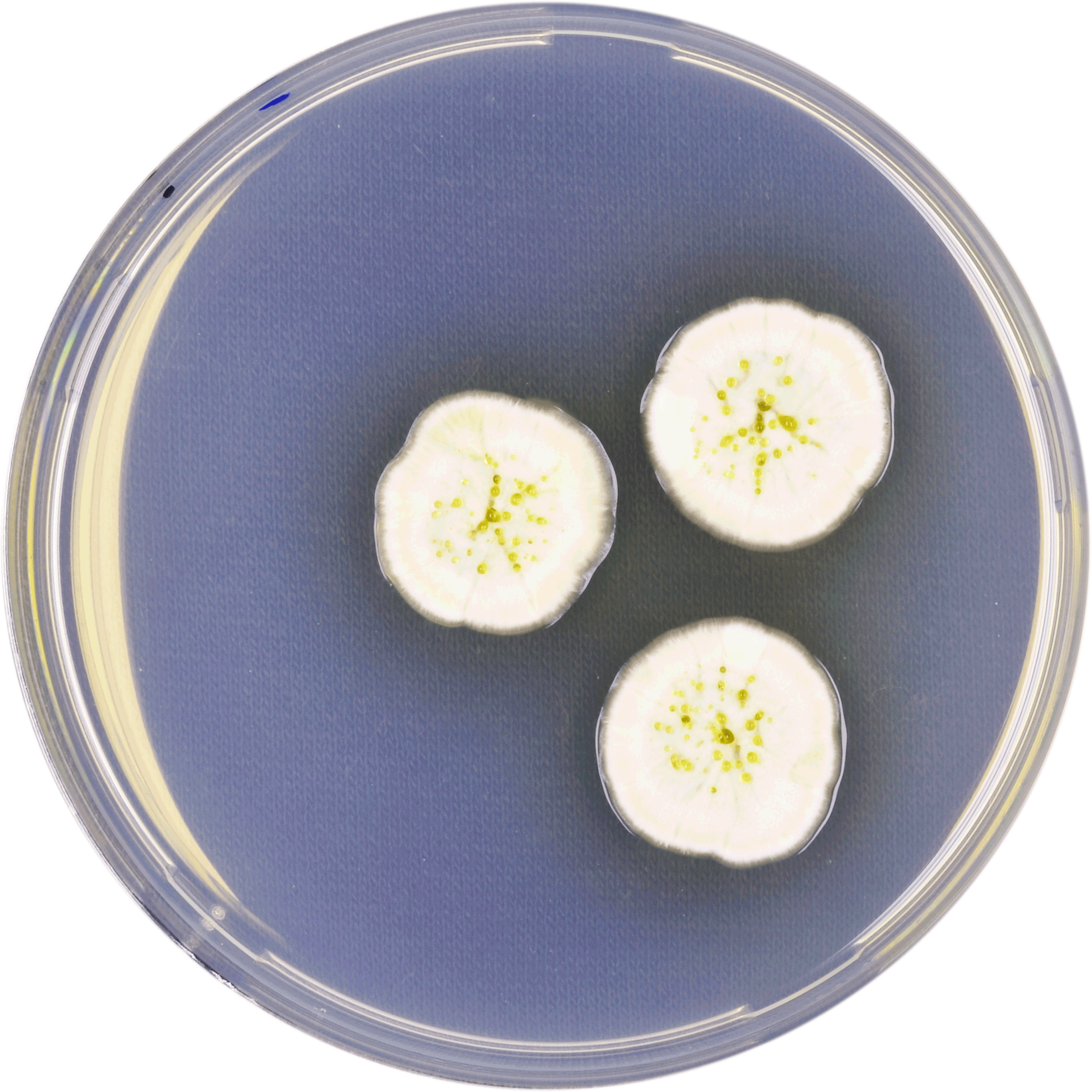
Aspergillus allahabadii growing on CYA plate

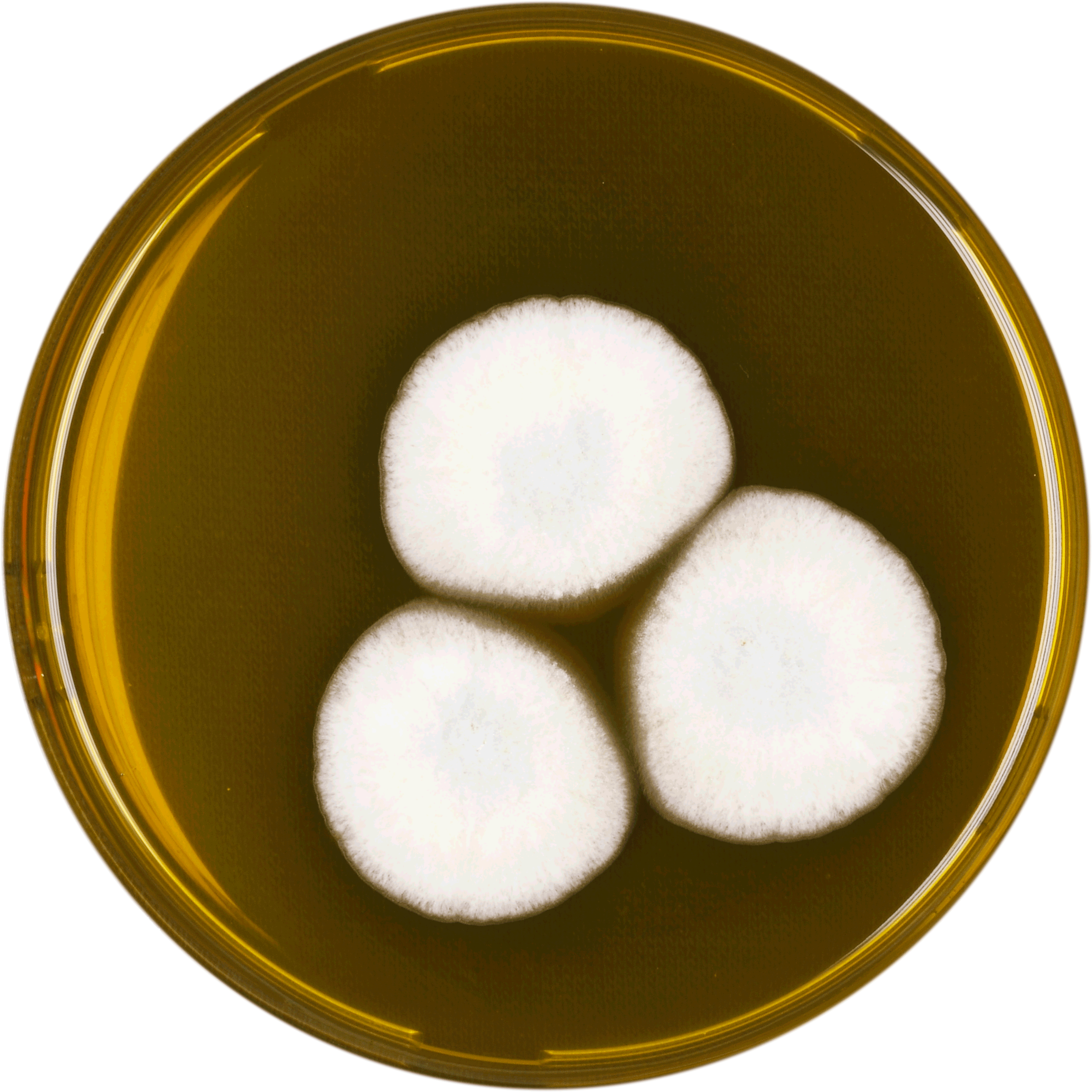
Aspergillus allahabadii growing on MEAOX plate
