= Aspergillus ardalensis =

Scientific classification
- Kingdom: Fungi
- Division: Ascomycota
- Class: Eurotiomycetes
- Order: Eurotiales
- Family: Aspergillaceae
- Genus: Aspergillus
- Species: A. ardalensis

Binomial name
- Aspergillus ardalensis A. Nováková, Hubka, M. Kolařík, S.W. Peterson (2015)

Species of fungus

Aspergillus ardalensis is a species of fungus in the genus Aspergillus. It is from the Flavipedes section. The species was first described in 2015.

== Growth and morphology ==
A. ardalensis has been cultivated on both Czapek yeast extract agar (CYA) plates and Malt Extract Agar Oxoid® (MEAOX) plates. The growth morphology of the colonies can be seen in the pictures below.

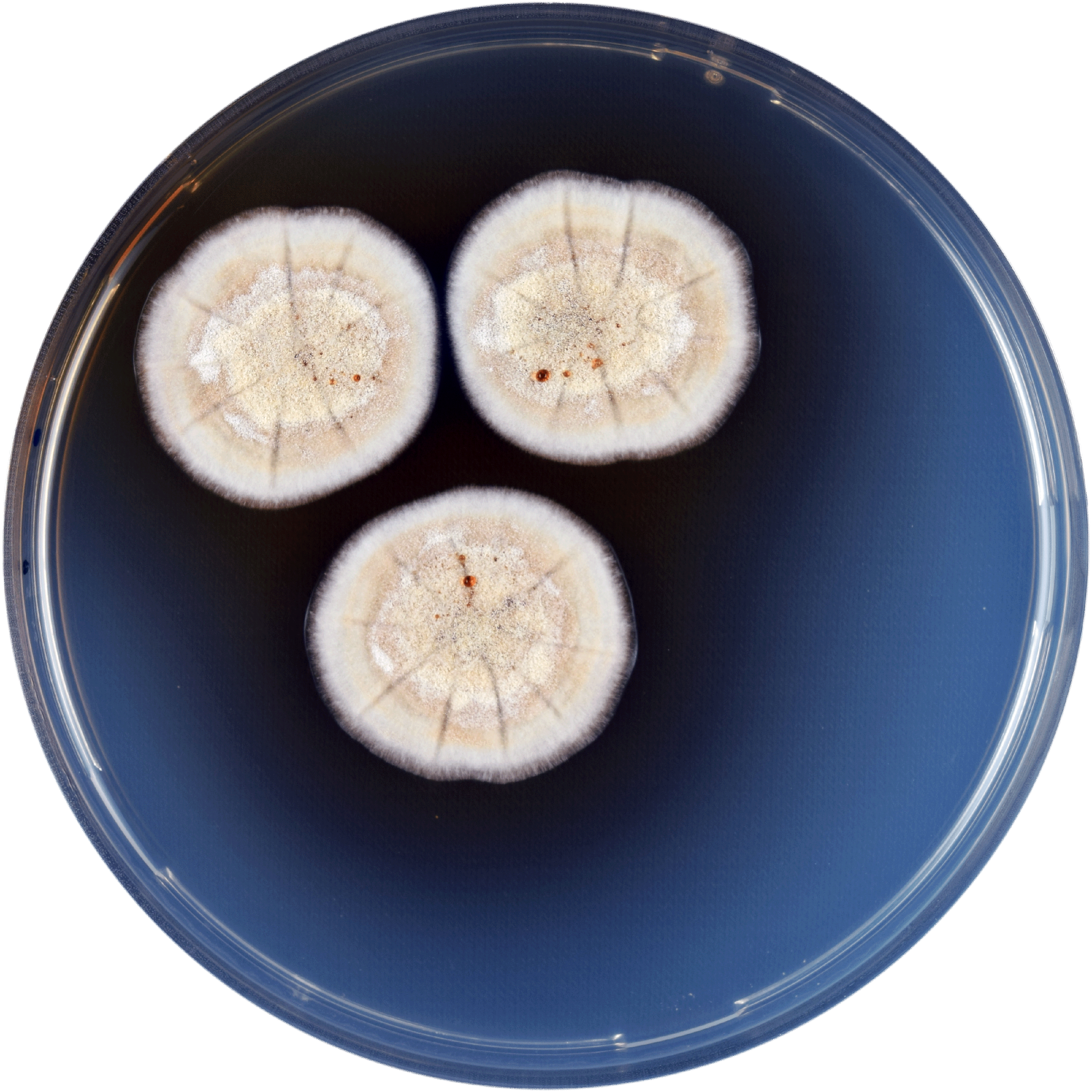
Aspergillus ardalensis growing on CYA plate

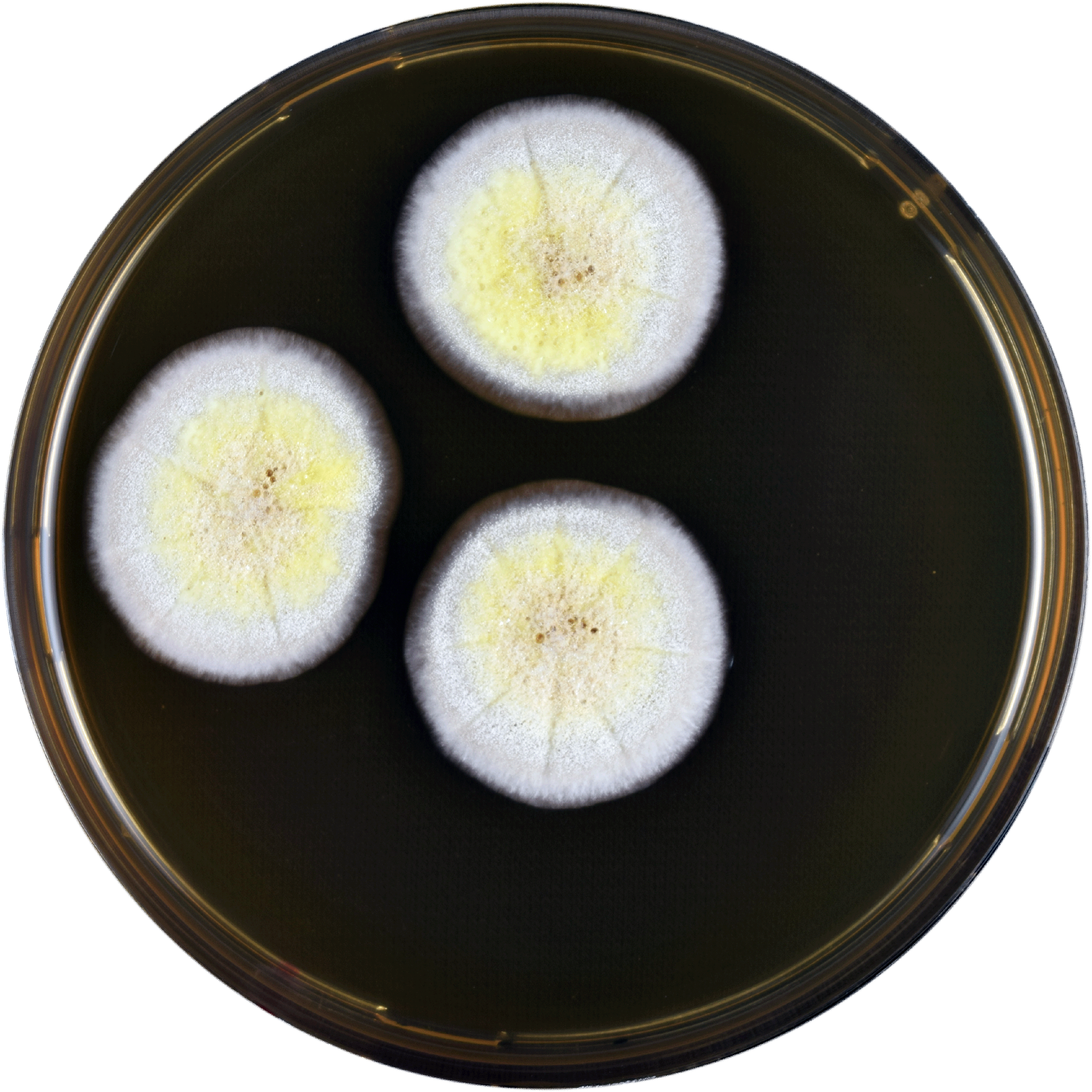
Aspergillus ardalensis growing on MEAOX plate
