= Aspergillus micronesiensis =

Scientific classification
- Kingdom: Fungi
- Division: Ascomycota
- Class: Eurotiomycetes
- Order: Eurotiales
- Family: Aspergillaceae
- Genus: Aspergillus
- Species: A. micronesiensis

Binomial name
- Aspergillus micronesiensis C.M. Visagie, Y. Hirooka & R.A. Samson (2014)

Species of mold

Aspergillus micronesiensis is a species of fungus in the genus Aspergillus. It is from the Flavipedes section. The species was first described in 2014.
