= Aspergillus fresenii =

Scientific classification
- Kingdom: Fungi
- Division: Ascomycota
- Class: Eurotiomycetes
- Order: Eurotiales
- Family: Aspergillaceae
- Genus: Aspergillus
- Species: A. fresenii

Binomial name
- Aspergillus fresenii Subramanian 1971

Type strain
- ATCC 16893, CBS 550.65, IMI 211397, LCP 89.2593

Synonyms
- Sterigmatocystis sulphurea

Species of fungus

Aspergillus fresenii is a species of fungus in the genus Aspergillus. Aspergillus fresenii produces ochratoxin A, ochratoxin B, ochratoxin C, aspochracins, mellamides, orthosporins, radarins, secopenitrems, sulphinines, xanthomegnins.
