= Aspergillus neoindicus =

Scientific classification
- Kingdom: Fungi
- Division: Ascomycota
- Class: Eurotiomycetes
- Order: Eurotiales
- Family: Aspergillaceae
- Genus: Aspergillus
- Species: A. neoindicus

Binomial name
- Aspergillus neoindicus Samson, S.W. Peterson, Frisvad & Varga (2011)

Species of fungus

Aspergillus neoindicus is a species of fungus in the genus Aspergillus. It is from the Terrei section. The species was first described in 2011. It has been reported to produce citrinin, naphthalic anhydride, and atrovenetins.

== Growth and morphology ==
A. neoindicus has been cultivated on both Czapek yeast extract agar (CYA) plates and Malt Extract Agar Oxoid® (MEAOX) plates. The growth morphology of the colonies can be seen in the pictures below.

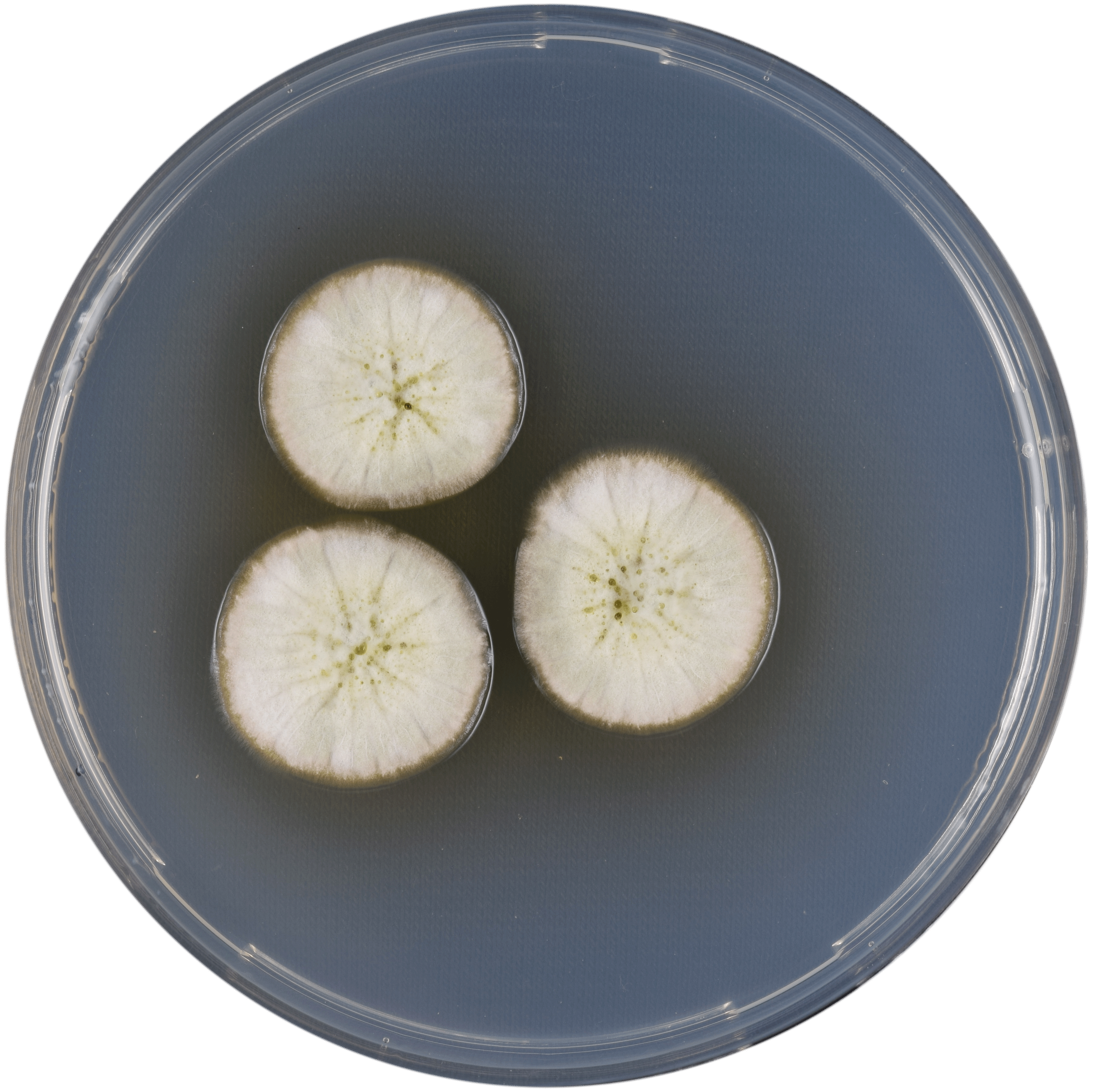
Aspergillus neoindicus growing on CYA plate

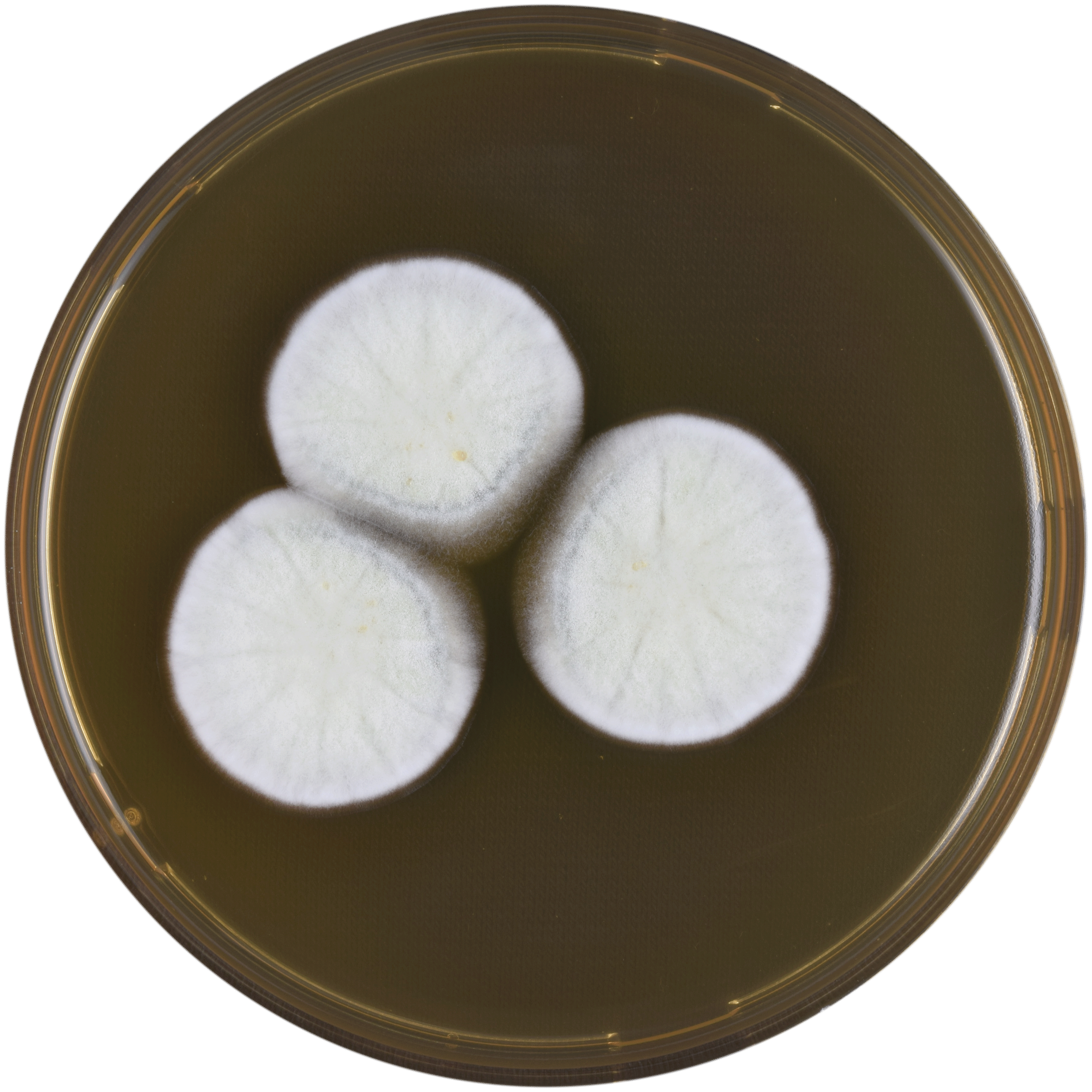
Aspergillus neoindicus growing on MEAOX plate
