= Aspergillus subramanianii =

Scientific classification
- Kingdom: Fungi
- Division: Ascomycota
- Class: Eurotiomycetes
- Order: Eurotiales
- Family: Aspergillaceae
- Genus: Aspergillus
- Species: A. subramanianii

Binomial name
- Aspergillus subramanianii C.M. Visagie, J.C. Frisvad & R.A. Samson (2014)

Species of fungus

Aspergillus subramanianii is a species of fungus in the genus Aspergillus. It is from the Circumdati section. The species was first described in 2014. It has been reported to produce penicillic acid.

== Growth and morphology ==
A. subramanianii has been cultivated on both Czapek yeast extract agar (CYA) plates and Malt Extract Agar Oxoid® (MEAOX) plates. The growth morphology of the colonies can be seen in the pictures below.

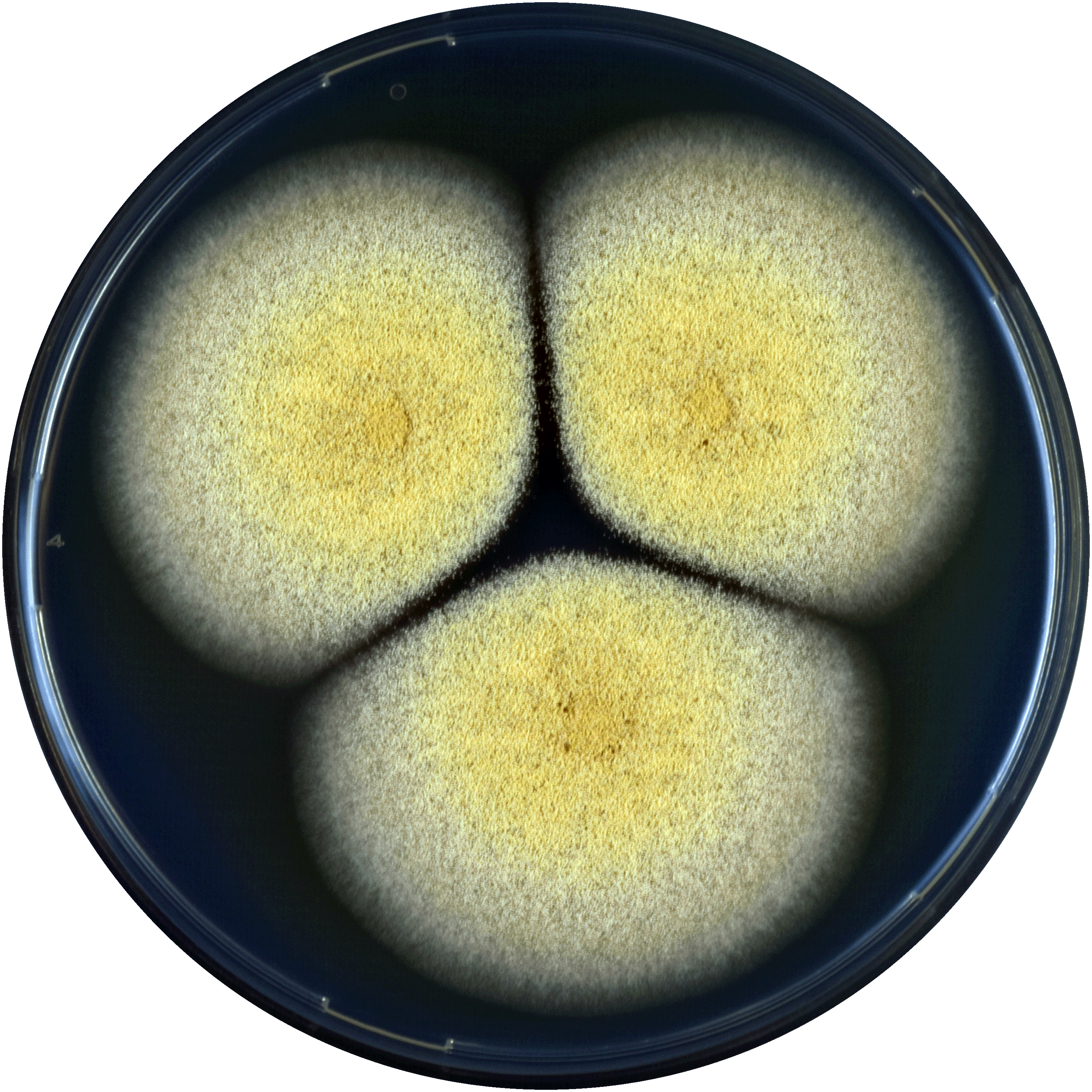
Aspergillus subramanianii growing on CYA plate

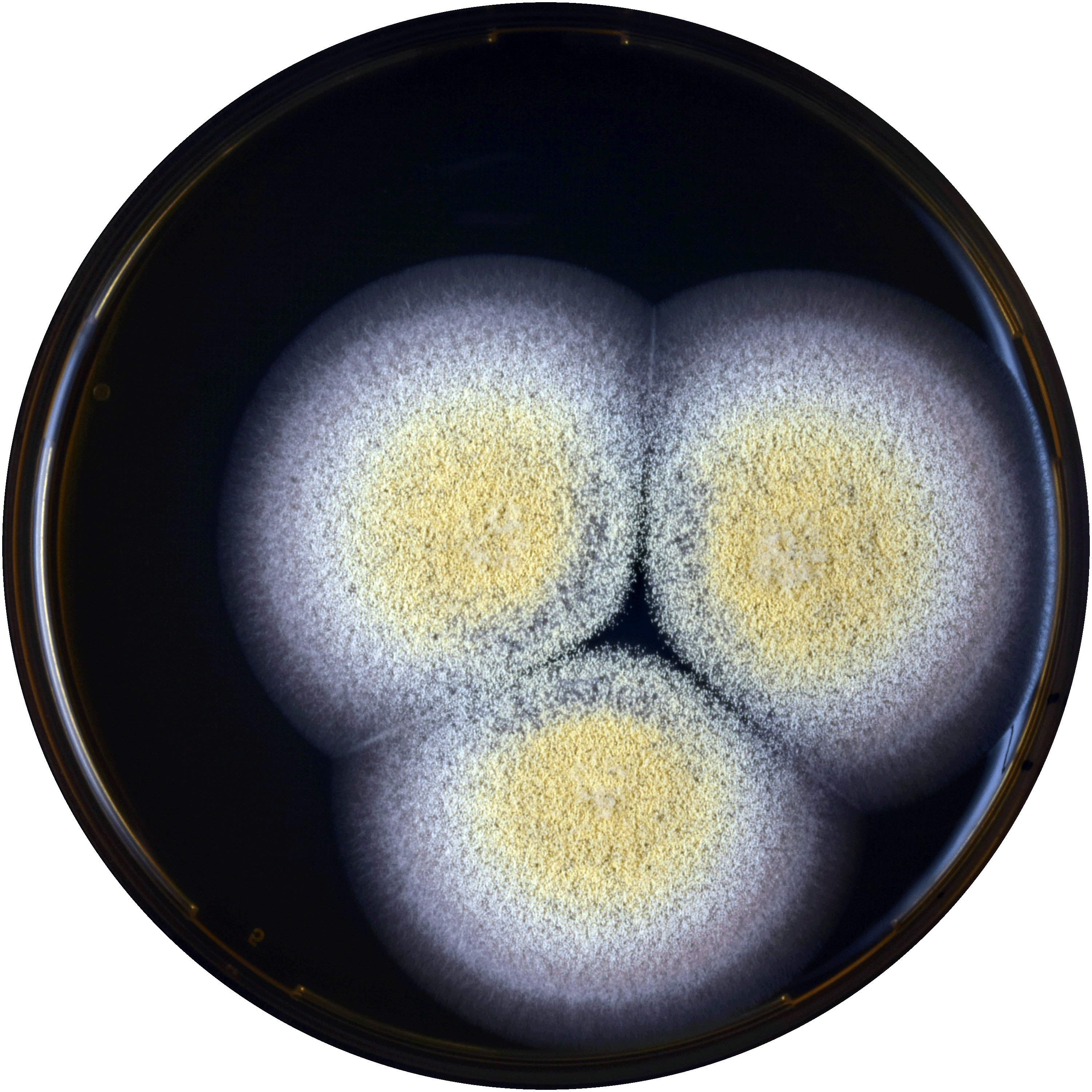
Aspergillus subramanianii growing on MEAOX plate
