= Aspergillus capensis =

Scientific classification
- Kingdom: Fungi
- Division: Ascomycota
- Class: Eurotiomycetes
- Order: Eurotiales
- Family: Aspergillaceae
- Genus: Aspergillus
- Species: A. capensis

Binomial name
- Aspergillus capensis Visagie, Hirooka & Samson (2014)

Species of fungus

Aspergillus capensis is a species of fungus in the genus Aspergillus. It is from the Flavipedes section. The species was first described in 2014.

== Growth and morphology ==
A. capensis has been cultivated on both Czapek yeast extract agar (CYA) plates and Malt Extract Agar Oxoid® (MEAOX) plates. The growth morphology of the colonies can be seen in the pictures below.

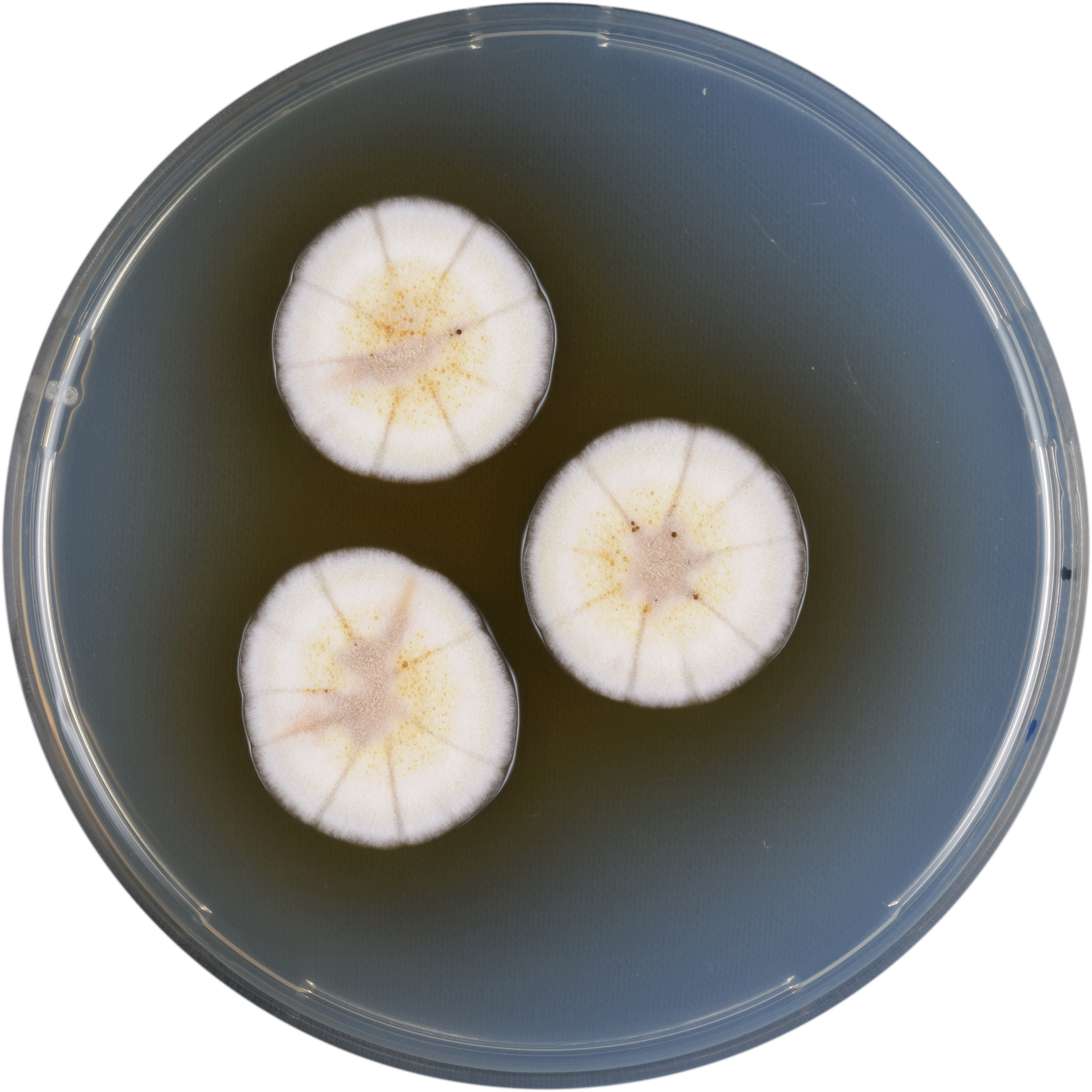
Aspergillus capensis growing on CYA plate

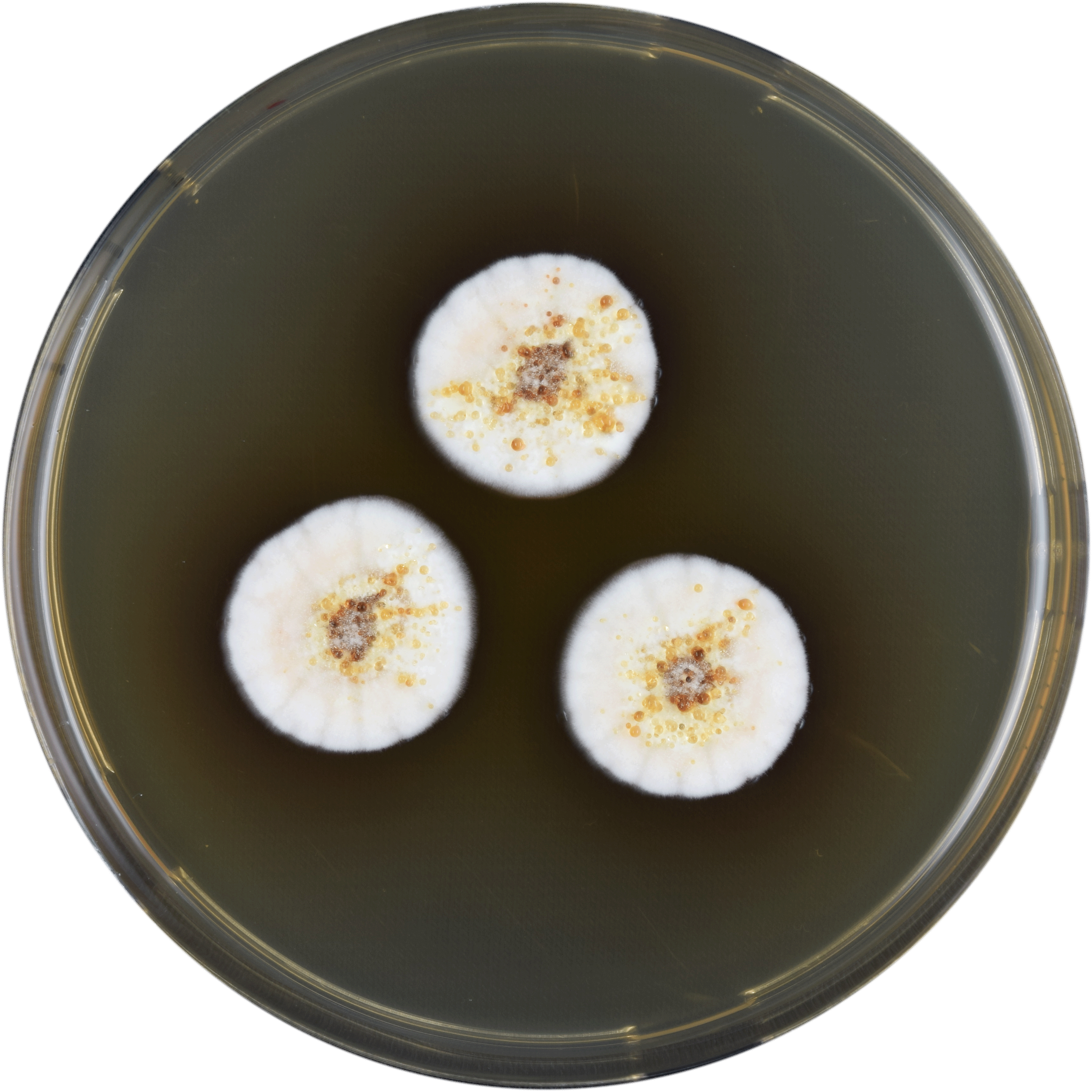
Aspergillus capensis growing on MEAOX plate
