= Aspergillus muricatus =

Scientific classification
- Kingdom: Fungi
- Division: Ascomycota
- Class: Eurotiomycetes
- Order: Eurotiales
- Family: Aspergillaceae
- Genus: Aspergillus
- Species: A. muricatus

Binomial name
- Aspergillus muricatus Udagawa, Uchiyama & Kamiya (1994)

Species of fungus

Aspergillus muricatus is a species of fungus in the genus Aspergillus. It is from the Circumdati section. The species was first described in 1994. It has been isolated from soil in the Philippines and is reported to produce petromurins.

== Growth and morphology ==
A. muricatus has been cultivated on both Czapek yeast extract agar (CYA) plates and Malt Extract Agar Oxoid® (MEAOX) plates. The growth morphology of the colonies can be seen in the pictures below.

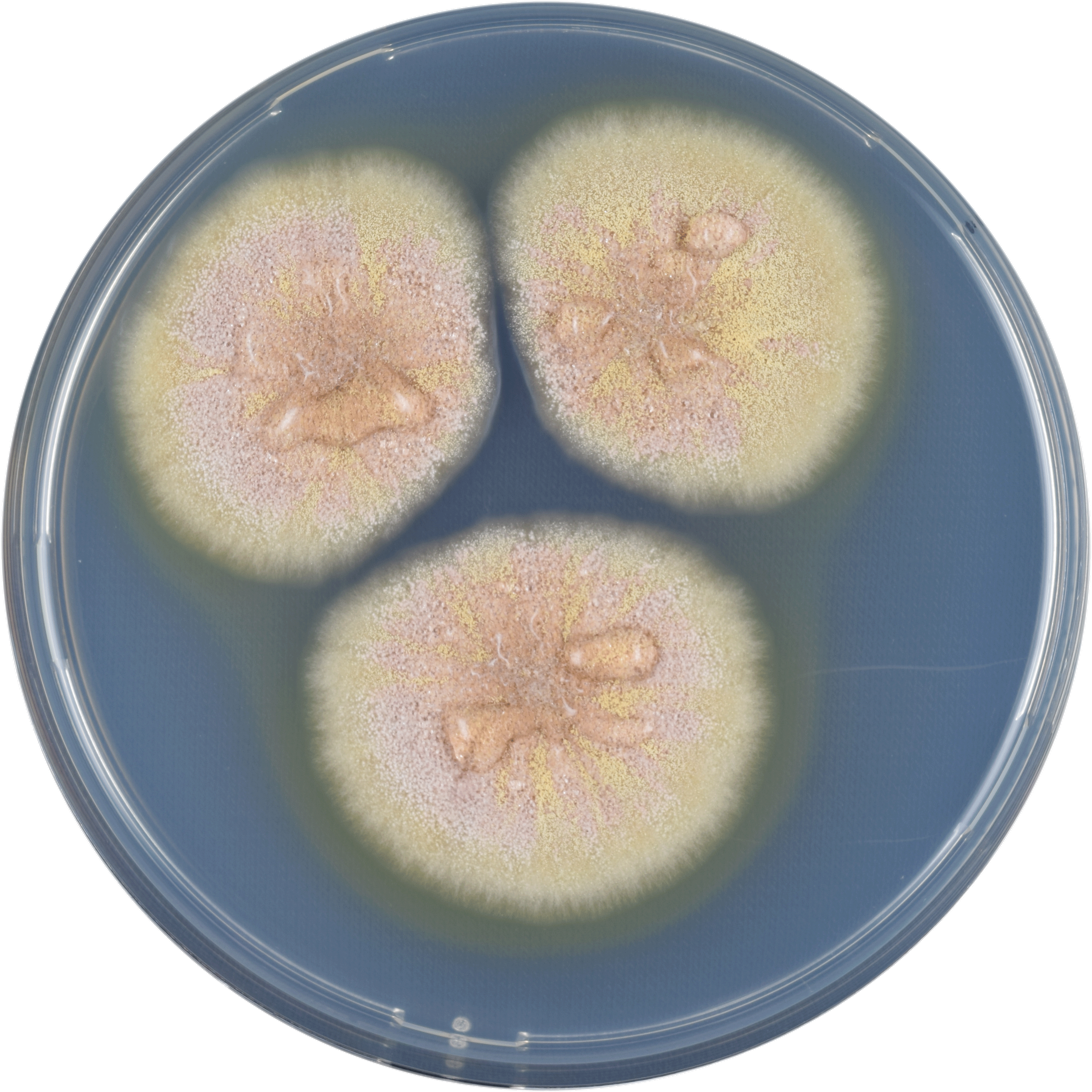
Aspergillus muricatus growing on CYA plate

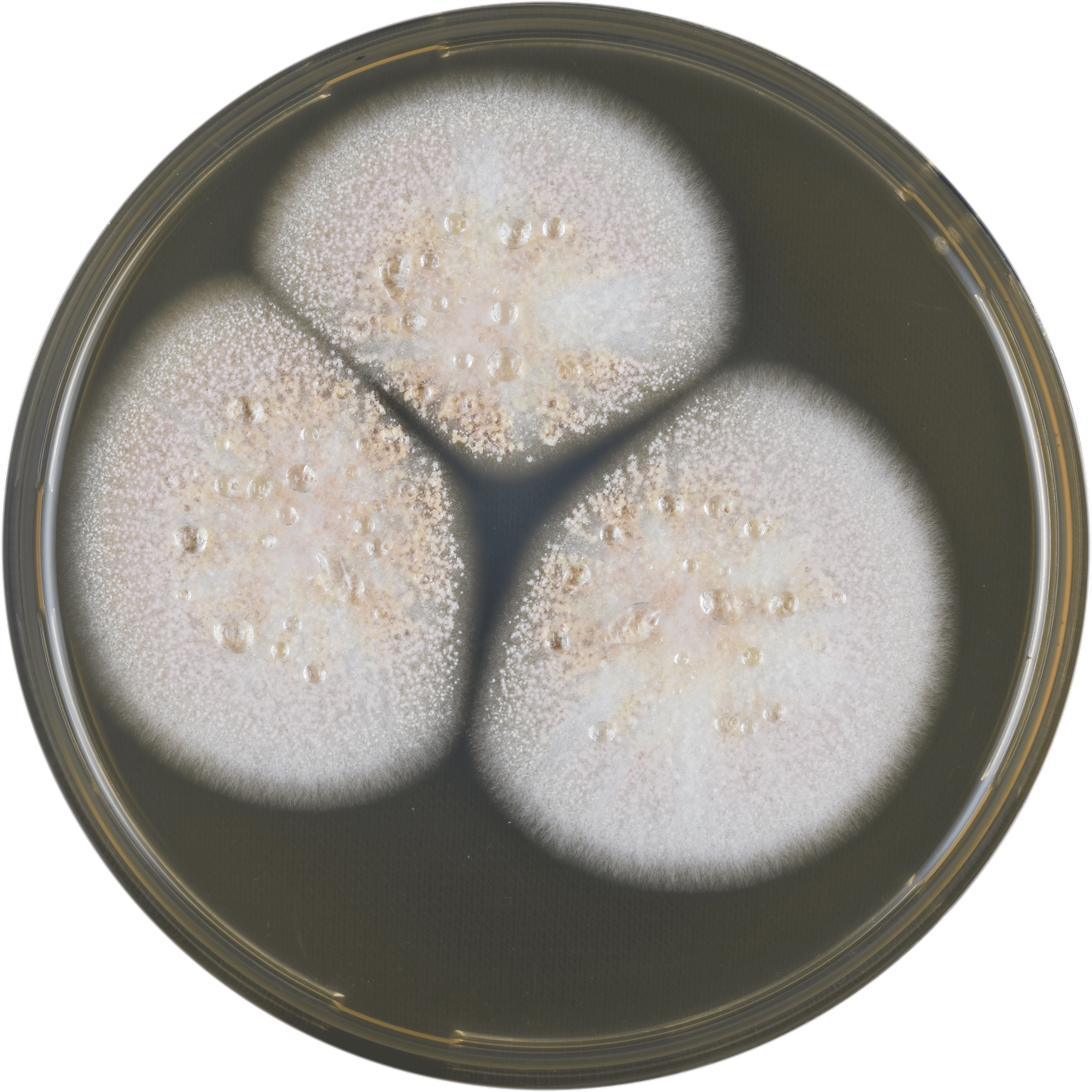
Aspergillus muricatus growing on MEAOX plate
