= IARC group 3 =

IARC group 3 substances, chemical mixtures and exposure circumstances are those that can not be classified in regard to their carcinogenicity to humans by the International Agency for Research on Cancer (IARC). This category is used most commonly for agents, mixtures and exposure circumstances for which the level of evidence of carcinogenicity is inadequate in humans and inadequate or limited in experimental animals. Exceptionally, agents (mixtures) for which the evidence of carcinogenicity is inadequate in humans, but sufficient in experimental animals may be placed in this category when there is strong evidence that the mechanism of carcinogenicity in experimental animals does not operate in humans. Agents, mixtures and exposure circumstances that do not fall into any other group are also placed in this category.

The IARC Monographs on which this list is based assess the hazard linked to the agents, they do not assess the cancer risk of the agents. The list is up-to-date as of January 2024.

== Agents and groups of agents ==
=== A ===
- Acenaphthene
- Acepyrene
- Aciclovir
- Acridine orange
- Acriflavinium chloride
- Acrylic acid
- Acrylic fibres
- Acrylonitrile-butadiene-styrene copolymers
- Actinomycin D
- Agaritine
- Aldicarb
- Aldrin
- Allyl chloride
- Allyl isothiocyanate
- Allyl isovalerate
- Amaranth (dye)
- 5-Aminoacenaphthene
- 2-Aminoanthraquinone
- para-Aminobenzoic acid
- 1-Amino-2-methylanthraquinone
- 2-Amino-4-nitrophenol
- 2-Amino-5-nitrophenol
- 4-Amino-2-nitrophenol
- 2-Amino-5-nitrothiazole
- 11-Aminoundecanoic acid
- Amitrole
- Ampicillin
- Anaesthetics, volatile
- Angelicin plus ultraviolet A radiation
- para-Anisidine
- Anthanthrene
- Anthracene
- Anthranilic acid
- Antimony trisulfide
- Apholate
- para-Aramid fibrils
- Atrazine
- Aurothioglucose (Auranofin)
- 2-(1-Aziridinyl)ethanol
- Aziridyl benzoquinone
- Azobenzene

=== B ===
- 11H-Benz[bc]aceanthrylene
- Benz[l]aceanthrylene
- Benz[a]acridine
- Benz[c]acridine
- Benzo[g]chrysene
- Benzo[a]fluoranthene
- Benzo[ghi]fluoranthene
- Benzo[a]fluorene
- Benzo[b]fluorene
- Benzo[c]fluorene
- Benzo[ghi]perylene
- Benzo[e]pyrene
- p-Benzoquinone dioxime
- Benzoyl peroxide
- Benzyl acetate
- Bis(1-aziridinyl)morpholinophosphine sulfide
- Bis(2-chloroethyl)ether
- 1,2-Bis(chloromethoxy)ethane
- 1,4-Bis(chloromethoxymethyl)benzene
- Bis(2-chloro-1-methylethyl)ether
- Bis(2,3-epoxycyclopentyl)ether
- Bisphenol A diglycidyl ether (Aralditeâ)
- Bisulfites
- Blue VRS
- Brilliant Blue FCF, disodium salt
- Bromochloroacetonitrile
- Bromoethane
- Bromoform
- 2-Butoxyethanol
- 1-tert-Butoxy-2-propanol
- n-Butyl acrylate
- Butylated hydroxytoluene (BHT)
- Butyl benzyl phthalate
- γ-Butyrolactone

=== C ===
- Caffeine
- Cantharidin
- Caprolactam
- Captan
- Carbaryl
- 3-Carbethoxypsoralen
- Carmoisine
- Carrageenan
- Chloramine
- Chlordimeform
- Chlorinated drinking water
- Chloroacetonitrile
- Chlorobenzilate
- Chlorodibromomethane
- Chlorodifluoromethane
- Chloroethane
- Chlorofluoromethane
- 4-Chloro-meta-phenylenediamine
- Chloronitrobenzenes
- Chloropropham
- Chloroquine
- 5-Chloro-ortho-toluidine
- 2-Chloro-1,1,1-trifluoroethane
- Cholesterol
- Chromium(III) compounds
- Chromium, metallic
- Chrysoidine
- CI Acid Orange 3
- Cimetidine
- Cinnamyl anthranilate
- CI Pigment Red 3
- Citrinin
- Clofibrate
- Clomiphene citrate
- Coal dust
- Cobalt(II) sulfide
- Cobalt(II,III) oxide
  - Other cobalt(II) compounds (not including soluble cobalt(II) salts, cobalt(II) oxide, cobalt(II,III) oxide, and cobalt(II) sulfide)
- Continuous glass filament
- Copper 8-hydroxyquinoline
- Coronene
- Coumarin
- m-Cresidine
- Cyclamates
- Cyclochlorotine
- Cyclohexanone
- 4H-Cyclopenta[def]chrysene
- 5,6-Cyclopenteno-1,2-benzanthracene

=== D ===
- D & C Red No. 9
- Dapsone
- Decabromodiphenyl oxide
- Deltamethrin
- Diacetylaminoazotoluene
- Diallate
- 1,2-Diamino-4-nitrobenzene
- 1,4-Diamino-2-nitrobenzene
- 2,5-Diaminotoluene
- Diazepam
- Diazomethane
- Dibenz[a,c]anthracene
- Dibenz[a,j]anthracene
- Dibenzo-p-dioxin
- Dibenzo[a,e]fluoranthene
- 13H-Dibenzo[a,g]fluorene
- Dibenzo[h,rst]pentaphene
- Dibenzo[a,e]pyrene
- Dibenzo[e,l]pyrene
- Dichloroacetonitrile
- Dichloroacetylene
- m-Dichlorobenzene
- o-Dichlorobenzene
- trans-1,4-Dichlorobutene
- 2,6-Dichloro-p-phenylenediamine
- Dicofol
- Didanosine
- Di(2-ethylhexyl) adipate
- Di(2-ethylhexyl) phthalate
- N,N'-Diethylthiourea
- 1,2-Dihydroaceanthrylene
- Dihydroxymethylfuratrizine
- Dimethoxane
- 3,3'-Dimethoxybenzidine-4,4'-diisocyanate
- p-Dimethylaminoazobenzenediazo sodium sulfonate
- 4,4'-Dimethylangelicin plus ultraviolet A radiation
- 4,5'-Dimethylangelicin plus ultraviolet A radiation
- N,N-Dimethylaniline
- 1,4-Dimethylphenanthrene
- 3,5-Dinitrotoluene
- Dinitrosopentamethylenetetramine
- 2,4'-Diphenyldiamine
- Disperse Yellow 3
- Disulfiram
- Dithranol
- Doxefazepam
- Doxylamine succinate
- Droloxifene
- Dulcin

=== E–G ===
- Electric fields (extremely low-frequency)
- Electric fields (static)
- Endrin
- Eosin
- 3,4-Epoxy-6-methylcyclohexylmethyl-3,4-epoxy-6-methylcyclo-hexanecarboxylate
- cis-9,10-Epoxystearic acid
- Estazolam
- Ethionamide
- Ethylene
- Ethylene sulfide
- Ethylenethiourea
- Ethyl selenac
- Ethyl tellurac
- Eugenol
- Evans blue
- Fast Green FCF
- Fenvalerate
- Ferbam
- Ferric oxide
- Fluometuron
- Fluoranthene
- Fluorene
- Fluorescent lighting
- Fluorides (inorganic, used in drinking-water)
- 5-Fluorouracil
- Foreign bodies, implanted in tissues
  - Metallic chromium or titanium, cobalt-based, chromium-based and titanium-based alloys, stainless steel and depleted uranium
- Furazolidone
- Furfural
- Furosemide (Frusemide)
- Gemfibrozil
- Glycidyl oleate
- Glycidyl stearate
- Guinea Green B
- Gyromitrin

=== H–L ===
- Haematite
- HC Blue No. 2
- HC Red No. 3
- HC Yellow No. 4
- Hepatitis D virus
- Hexachlorobutadiene
- Hexachlorophene
- Human T-cell lymphotropic virus type II
- Hycanthone mesylate
- Hydralazine
- Hydrochloric acid
- Hydrogen peroxide
- Hydroquinone
- 4-Hydroxyazobenzene
- 8-Hydroxyquinoline
- Hydroxysenkirkine
- Hydroxyurea
- Hypochlorite salts
- Insulation glass wool
- Iron-dextrin complex
- Iron sorbitol-citric acid complex
- Isatidine
- Isonicotinic acid hydrazide (Isoniazid)
- Isophosphamide
- Isopropanol
- Isopropyl oils
- Isosafrole
- Jacobine
- Kaempferol
- Kojic acid
- Lauroyl peroxide
- Lead compounds, organic
- Leucogentian violet
- Light Green SF
- D-Limonene
- Luteoskyrin

=== M ===
- Madder root (Rubia tinctorum)
- Magnetic fields (static)
- Malachite green
- Maleic hydrazide
- Malonaldehyde
- Maneb
- Mannomustine dihydrochloride
- Medphalan
- 6-Mercaptopurine
- Mercury and inorganic mercury compounds
- Metabisulfites
- Methimazole
- Methotrexate
- Methoxychlor
- 5-Methylangelicin
- Methyl bromide
- Methyl tert-butyl ether
- Methyl carbamate
- Methyl chloride
- 1-Methylchrysene
- 2-Methylchrysene
- 3-Methylchrysene
- 4-Methylchrysene
- 6-Methylchrysene
- N-Methyl-N,4-dinitrosoaniline
- 4,4'-Methylene bis(N,N-dimethyl)benzenamine
- 4,4'-Methylenediphenyl diisocyanate
- 2-Methylfluoranthene
- 3-Methylfluoranthene
- Methylglyoxal
- Methyl iodide
- Methyl methacrylate
- Methyl parathion
- 1-Methylphenanthrene
- 7-Methylpyrido[3,4-c]psoralen
- Methyl red
- Methyl selenac
- Microcystis extracts
- Modacrylic fibres
- Monuron
- Morpholine
- Musk ambrette
- Musk xylene

=== N–O ===
- 1,5-Naphthalenediamine
- 1,5-Naphthalene diisocyanate
- Naphtho[1,2-b]fluoranthene
- Naphtho[2,1-a]fluoranthene
- Naphtho[2,3-e]pyrene
- 1-Naphthylamine
- 1-Naphthylthiourea (ANTU)
- Nithiazide
- 5-Nitro-ortho-anisidine
- 9-Nitroanthracene
- 7-Nitrobenz[a]anthracene
- 6-Nitrobenzo[a]pyrene
- 4-Nitrobiphenyl
- 3-Nitrofluoranthene
- Nitrofural (Nitrofurazone)
- Nitrofurantoin
- 1-Nitronaphthalene
- 2-Nitronaphthalene
- 3-Nitroperylene
- 2-Nitropyrene
- N'-Nitrosoanabasine
- N'-Nitrosoanatabine
- N-Nitrosodiphenylamine
- para-Nitrosodiphenylamine
- N-Nitrosofolic acid
- N-Nitrosoguvacine
- N-Nitrosoguvacoline
- N-Nitrosohydroxyproline
- 3-(N-Nitrosomethylamino)propionaldehyde
- 4-(N-Nitrosomethylamino)-4-(3-pyridyl)-1-butanal (NNA)
- N-Nitrosoproline
- Nitrotoluenes
- 5-Nitro-ortho-toluidine
- Nitrovin
- Nodularins
- Nylon 6
- Oestradiol mustard
- Opisthorchis felineus (infection with)
- Orange I
- Orange G
- Oxyphenbutazone

=== P ===
- Palygorskite (attapulgite) (short fibres, < 5 micrometers)
- Paracetamol (Acetaminophen)
- Parasorbic acid
- Patulin
- Penicillic acid
- Pentachloroethane
- Pentavalent antimony
- Permethrin
- Perylene
- Petasitenine
- Phenanthrene
- Phenelzine sulfate
- Phenicarbazide
- Phenol
- Phenylbutazone
- meta-Phenylenediamine
- para-Phenylenediamine
- N-Phenyl-2-naphthylamine
- ortho-Phenylphenol
- Picene
- Picloram
- β-Picoline
- Piperonyl butoxide
- Polyacrylic acid
- Polychlorinated dibenzo-p-dioxins (other than 2,3,7,8-tetrachlorodibenzo-p-dioxin)
- Polychlorinated dibenzofurans
- Polychloroprene
- Polyethylene
- Polymethylene polyphenyl isocyanate
- Polymethyl methacrylate
- Polypropylene
- Polystyrene
- Polytetrafluoroethylene (Teflon)
- Polyurethane foams
- Polyvinyl acetate
- Polyvinyl alcohol
- Polyvinyl chloride
- Polyvinyl pyrrolidone
- Ponceau SX
- Potassium bis(2-hydroxyethyl)dithiocarbamate
- Prazepam
- Prednimustine
- Prednisone
- Proflavine salts
- Pronetalol hydrochloride
- Propham
- n-Propyl carbamate
- Propylene
- Ptaquiloside
- Pyrene
- Pyridine
- Pyrido[3,4-c]psoralen
- Pyrimethamine

=== Q–R ===
- Quercetin
- para-Quinone
- Quintozene (Pentachloronitrobenzene)
- Reserpine
- Resorcinol
- Retrorsine
- Rhodamine B
- Rhodamine 6G
- Rifampicin
- Ripazepam
- Rock (stone) wool
- Rugulosin

=== S ===
- Saccharated iron oxide
- Saccharin and its salts
- Scarlet Red
- Schistosoma mansoni (infection with)
- Selenium and selenium compounds
- Semicarbazide hydrochloride
- Seneciphylline
- Senkirkine
- Sepiolite
- Shikimic acid
- Silica, amorphous
- Simazine
- Slag wool
- Sodium chlorite
- Sodium diethyldithiocarbamate
- Spironolactone
- Styrene-acrylonitrile copolymers
- Styrene-butadiene copolymers
- Succinic anhydride
- Sudan I
- Sudan II
- Sudan III
- Sudan Brown RR
- Sudan Red 7B
- Sulfafurazole (Sulfisoxazole)
- Sulfamethazine
- Sulfamethoxazole
- Sulfites
- Sulfur dioxide
- Sunset Yellow FCF
- Surgical implants
  - Orthopaedic implants and devices, of complex composition
  - Cardiac pacemakers
  - Dental materials
  - Ceramic materials
- Surgical implants, female breast reconstruction, silicone
- SV40
- Symphytine

=== T ===
- Talc, not containing asbestiform fibres
- Tannic acid and tannins
- Temazepam
- 2,2',5,5'-Tetrachlorobenzidine
- Tetrakis(hydroxymethyl)phosphonium salts
- Theobromine
- Theophylline
- Thiourea
- Thiram
- Toluene
- Toremifene
- Toxins derived from Fusarium graminearum, F. culmorum and F. crookwellense (zearalenone, deoxynivalenol, nivalenol, and fusarenone X)
- Toxins derived from Fusarium sporotrichioides
- Trichlorfon
- Trichloroacetonitrile
- 1,1,2-Trichloroethane
- Triethanolamine
- Triethylene glycol diglycidyl ether
- Trifluralin
- 4,4',6-Trimethylangelicin plus ultraviolet A radiation
- 2,4,5-Trimethylaniline
- 2,4,6-Trimethylaniline
- 4,5',8-Trimethylpsoralen
- 2,4,6-Trinitrotoluene
- Triphenylene
- Tris(aziridinyl)-para-benzoquinone (Triaziquone)
- Tris(1-aziridinyl)phosphine oxide
- 2,4,6-Tris(1-aziridinyl)-s-triazine
- Tris(2-chloroethyl) phosphate
- 1,2,3-Tris(chloromethoxy)propane
- Tris(2-methyl-1-aziridinyl)phosphine oxide

=== U–Z ===
- Vat Yellow 4
- Vinblastine sulfate
- Vincristine sulfate
- Vinyl chloride-vinyl acetate copolymers
- Vinylidene chloride-vinyl chloride copolymers
- Vinylidene fluoride
- N-Vinyl-2-pyrrolidone
- Vinyl toluene
- Vitamin K substances
- Wollastonite
- Xylenes
- 2,4-Xylidine
- 2,5-Xylidine
- Yellow AB
- Yellow OB
- Zectran
- Zeolites other than erionite (clinoptilolite, phillipsite, mordenite, non-fibrous Japanese zeolite, synthetic zeolites)
- Zineb
- Ziram

== Mixtures ==
- Bitumens, steam-refined, cracking-residue and air-refined
- Coffee, drinking
- Crude oil
- Diesel fuels, distillate (light)
- Fuel oils, distillate (light)
- Jet fuel
- Mate, not very hot (drinking)
- Mineral oils, highly refined
- Petroleum solvents
- Printing inks
- Tea
- Terpene polychlorinates (Strobane®)

== Exposure circumstances ==
- Calcium carbide production
- Flat-glass and specialty glass (manufacture of)
- Hair colouring products (personal use of)
- Leather goods manufacture
- Leather tanning and processing
- Lumber and sawmill industries (including logging)
- Paint manufacture (occupational exposure in)
- Pulp and paper manufacture

== See also ==
- IARC group 1
- IARC group 2A
- IARC group 2B
