= C10H7NO2 =

The molecular formula C_{10}H_{7}NO_{2} (molar mass: 173.17 g/mol) may refer to:

- Nitronaphthalenes
  - 1-Nitronaphthalene
  - 2-Nitronaphthalene
- Nitrosonaphthols
  - 1-Nitroso-2-naphthol
- Quinaldic acid
