= Aspergillus insulicola =

Scientific classification
- Kingdom: Fungi
- Division: Ascomycota
- Class: Eurotiomycetes
- Order: Eurotiales
- Family: Aspergillaceae
- Genus: Aspergillus
- Species: A. insulicola

Binomial name
- Aspergillus insulicola Montemayor & A.R. Santiago (1975)

Species of fungus

Aspergillus insulicola is a species of fungus in the genus Aspergillus. It is from the Circumdati section. The species was first described in 1975. It has been reported to produce xanthomegnin, viomellein, vioxanthin, and penicillic acid.

== Growth and morphology ==
A. insulicola has been cultivated on both Czapek yeast extract agar (CYA) plates and Malt Extract Agar Oxoid® (MEAOX) plates. The growth morphology of the colonies can be seen in the pictures below.

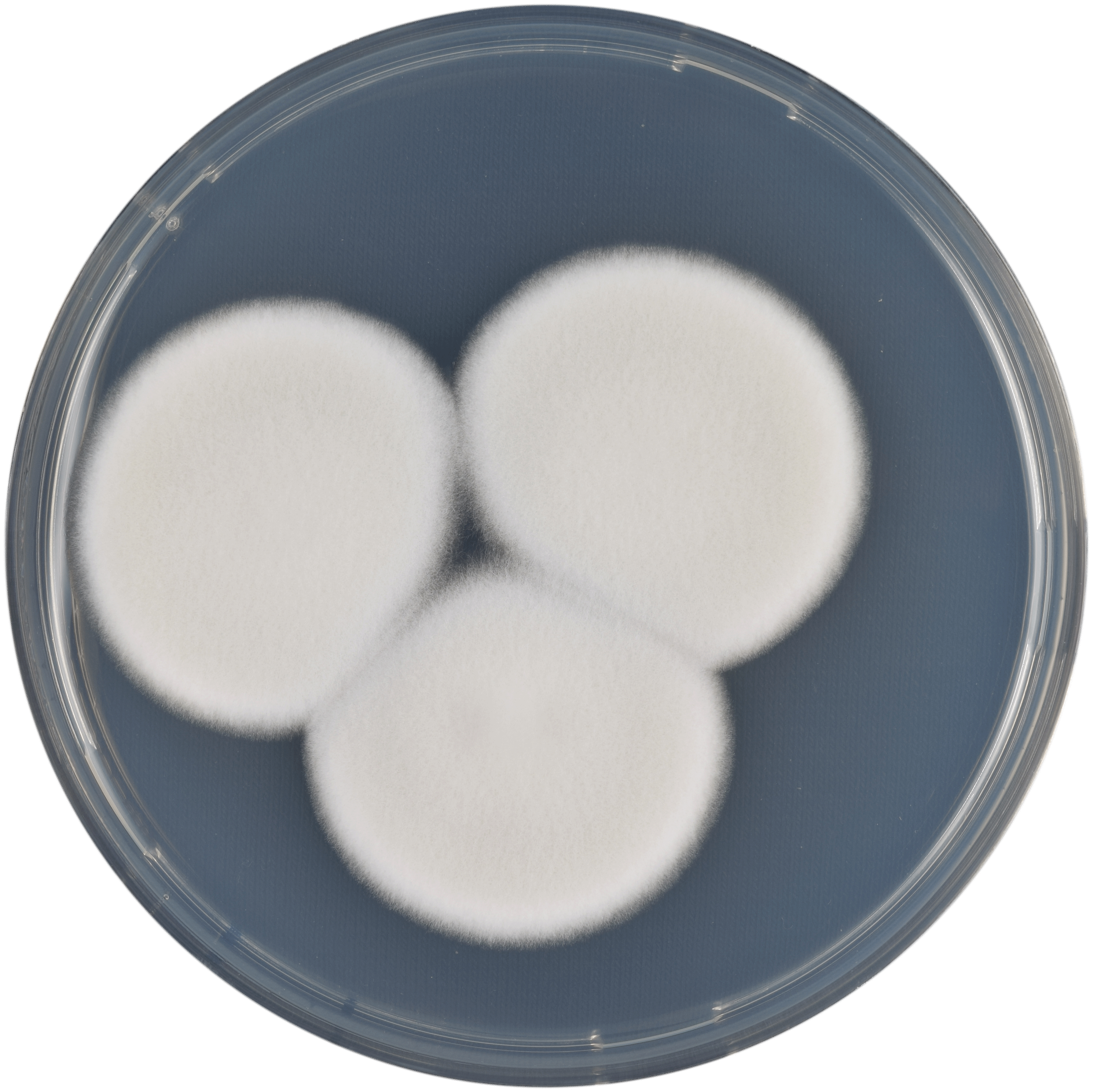
Aspergillus insulicola growing on CYA plate

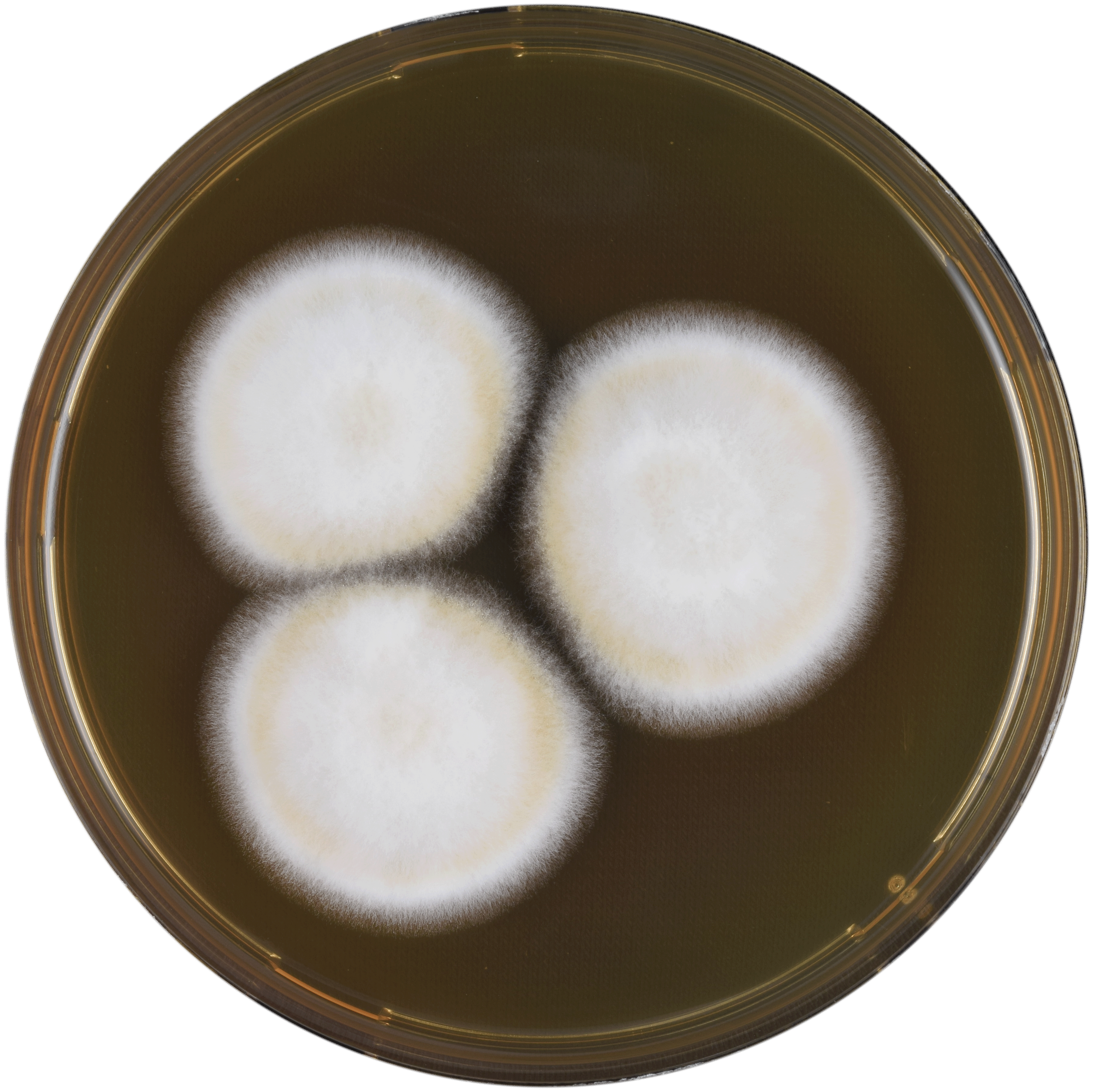
Aspergillus insulicola growing on MEAOX plate
