= Aspergillus sclerotiorum =

Scientific classification
- Domain: Eukaryota
- Kingdom: Fungi
- Division: Ascomycota
- Class: Eurotiomycetes
- Order: Eurotiales
- Family: Aspergillaceae
- Genus: Aspergillus
- Species: A. sclerotiorum

Binomial name
- Aspergillus sclerotiorum G.A. Huber (1933)

Species of fungus

Aspergillus sclerotiorum is a species of fungus in the genus Aspergillus. It is from the Circumdati section. The species was first described in 1933. A. sclerotiorum has been reported to produce penicillic acid, xanthomegnin, viomellein, and vioxanthin.

In 2016, the genome of A. sclerotiorum was sequenced as part of the Aspergillus whole-genome sequencing project - a project dedicated to performing whole-genome sequencing of all members of the genus Aspergillus. The genome assembly size was 37.97 Mbp.

== Growth and morphology ==
Aspergillus sclerotiorum has been cultivated on Czapek yeast extract agar (CYA) plates and Malt Extract Agar Oxoid (MEAOX) plates. The pictures below show the colonies' growth morphology.

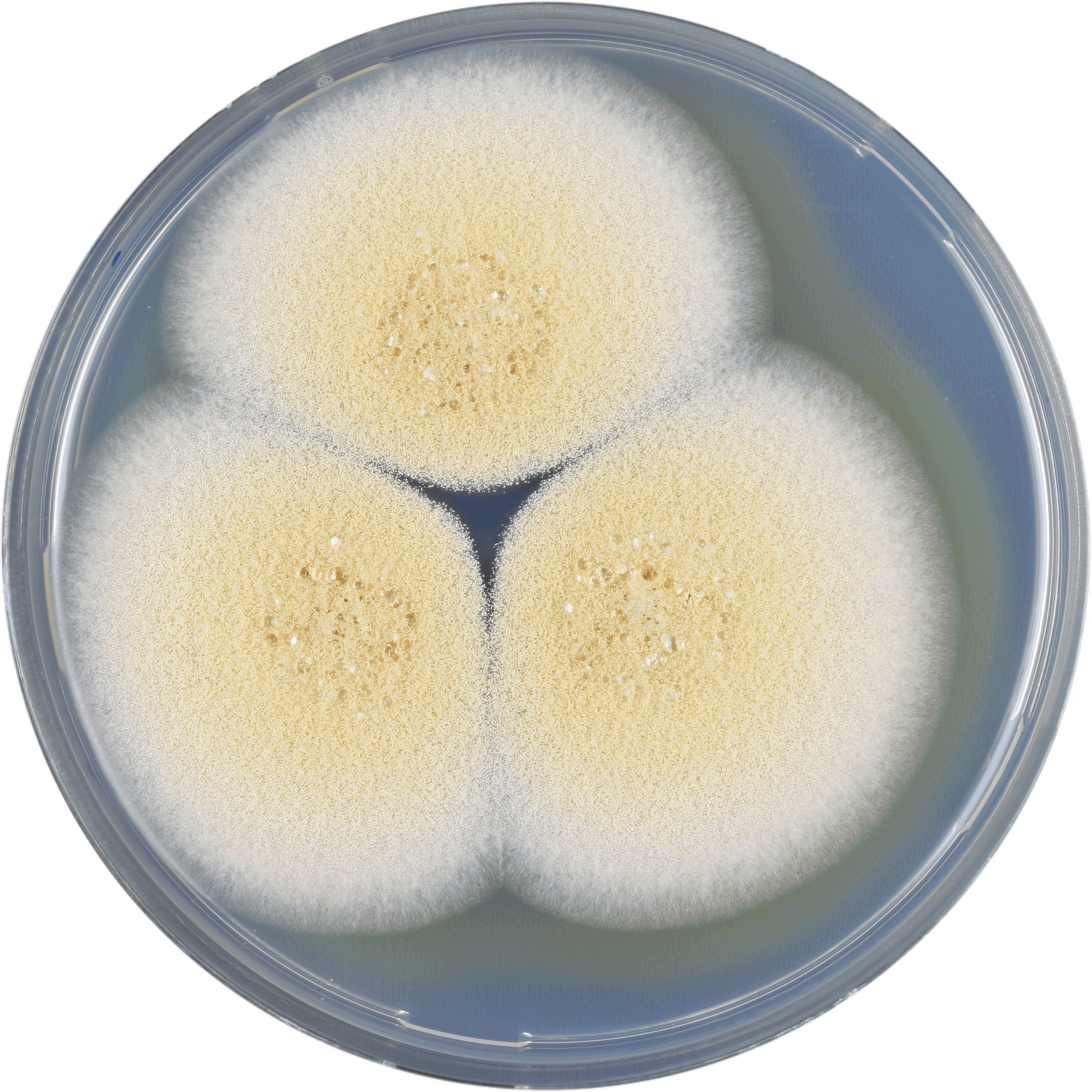
Aspergillus sclerotiorum growing on CYA plate

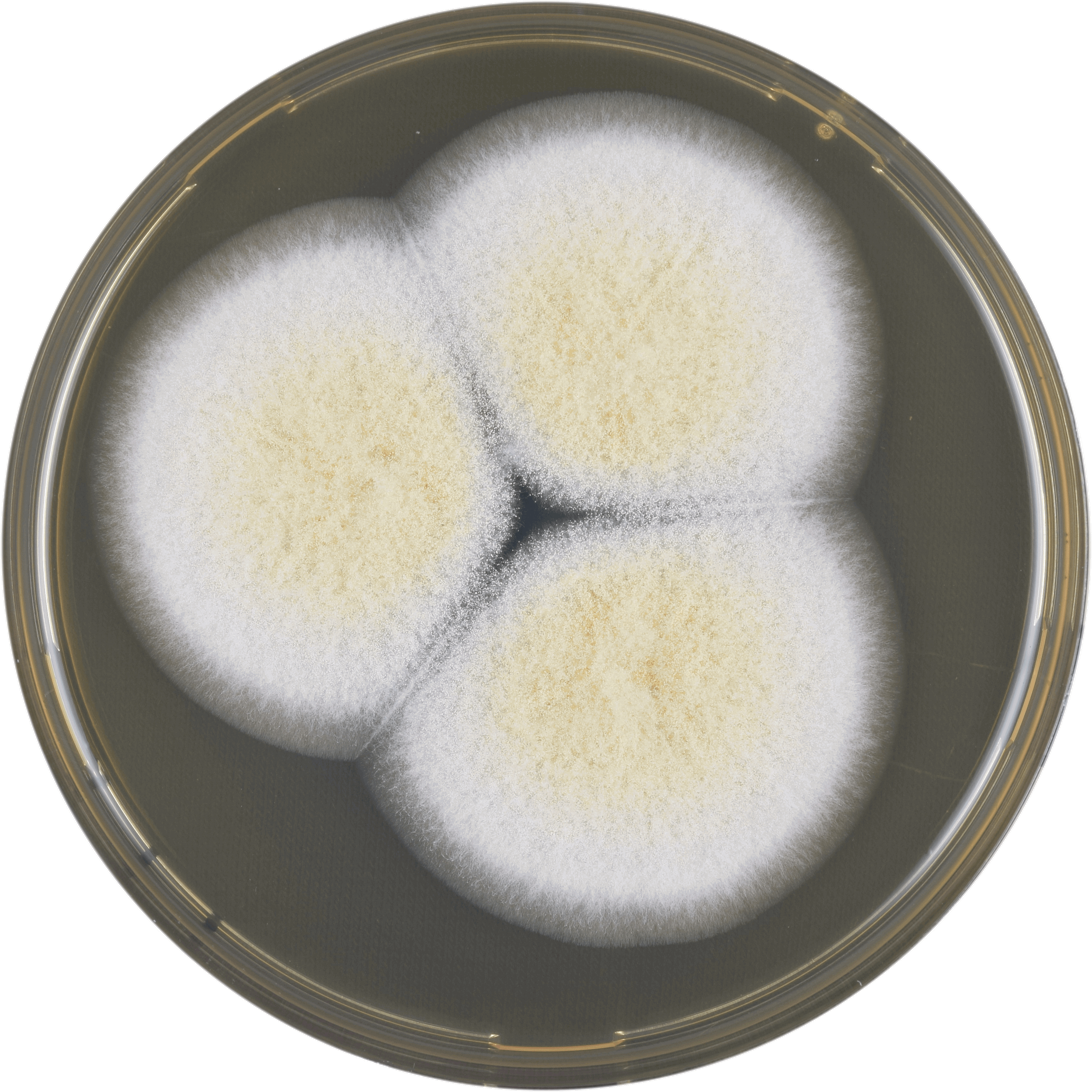
Aspergillus sclerotiorum growing on MEAOX plate

== Heavy Metal Tolerance ==
In a study published in Dec 2020, cadmium, chromium, and lead-tolerant microbes have been characterized and isolated from contaminated mining soil. Six soil samples were collected from Nanjing mine (32°09′19.29″ N 118°56′57.04″ E). Soil samples were taken from a depth of 0~30 cm and processed within 8 h. After collecting soil samples, these were kept on dry ice and further used to isolate fungi. Aspergillus Sclerotiorum was one of 5 identified strains that exhibited tolerance to all 3 of these heavy metals.

Molecular characterization of isolated fungi was performed, and amplified sequences were deposited in the GenBank NCBI database. Metal tolerance of the various strains has been determined by measuring the minimum inhibitory concentrations (MICs) and the tolerance indexes of all the tested strains against Cd, Cr, and Pb. Bioaccumulation capacities of Trichoderma harzianum and Komagataella phaffi have also been assessed. These findings helped us find a novel strain of Komagataella phaffi and suggested it be a potential mycoremediation microbe to alleviate the contamination of Cd, Cr, and Pb. Future studies of this fungal strain can also help us understand its resistance mechanism against other heavy metals.
