= Penicillium tricolor =

Scientific classification
- Kingdom: Fungi
- Division: Ascomycota
- Class: Eurotiomycetes
- Order: Eurotiales
- Family: Aspergillaceae
- Genus: Penicillium
- Species: P. tricolor

Binomial name
- Penicillium tricolor Frisvad, J.C.; Seifert, K.A.; Samson, R.A.; Mills, J.T. 1994

Type strain
- CBS 635.93, CCFC007894, DAOM 216240, IBT 12493, MUCL 45253

Species of fungus

Penicillium tricolor is a species of fungus in the genus Penicillium which was isolated from wheat in Canada. Penicillium tricolor produces xanthomegnin, viomellein, vioxanthin, terrestric acid, rugulosuvine, verrucofortine, puberuline, and asteltoxin.
