= Aspergillus roseoglobulosus =

Scientific classification
- Kingdom: Fungi
- Division: Ascomycota
- Class: Eurotiomycetes
- Order: Eurotiales
- Family: Aspergillaceae
- Genus: Aspergillus
- Species: A. roseoglobulosus

Binomial name
- Aspergillus roseoglobulosus Frisvad & Samson (2004)

Species of fungus

Aspergillus roseoglobulosus is a species of fungus in the genus Aspergillus. It is from the Circumdati section. The species was first described in 2004. It has been reported to produce ochratoxin A, penicillic acid, xanthomegnin, viomellein, and vioxanthin.

In 2016, the genome of A. roseoglobulosus was sequenced as a part of the Aspergillus whole-genome sequencing project - a project dedicated to performing whole-genome sequencing of all members of the genus Aspergillus. The genome assembly size was 35.82 Mbp.

== Growth and morphology ==
Aspergillus roseoglobulosus has been cultivated on both Czapek yeast extract agar (CYA) plates and Malt Extract Agar Oxoid® (MEAOX) plates. The growth morphology of the colonies can be seen in the pictures below.

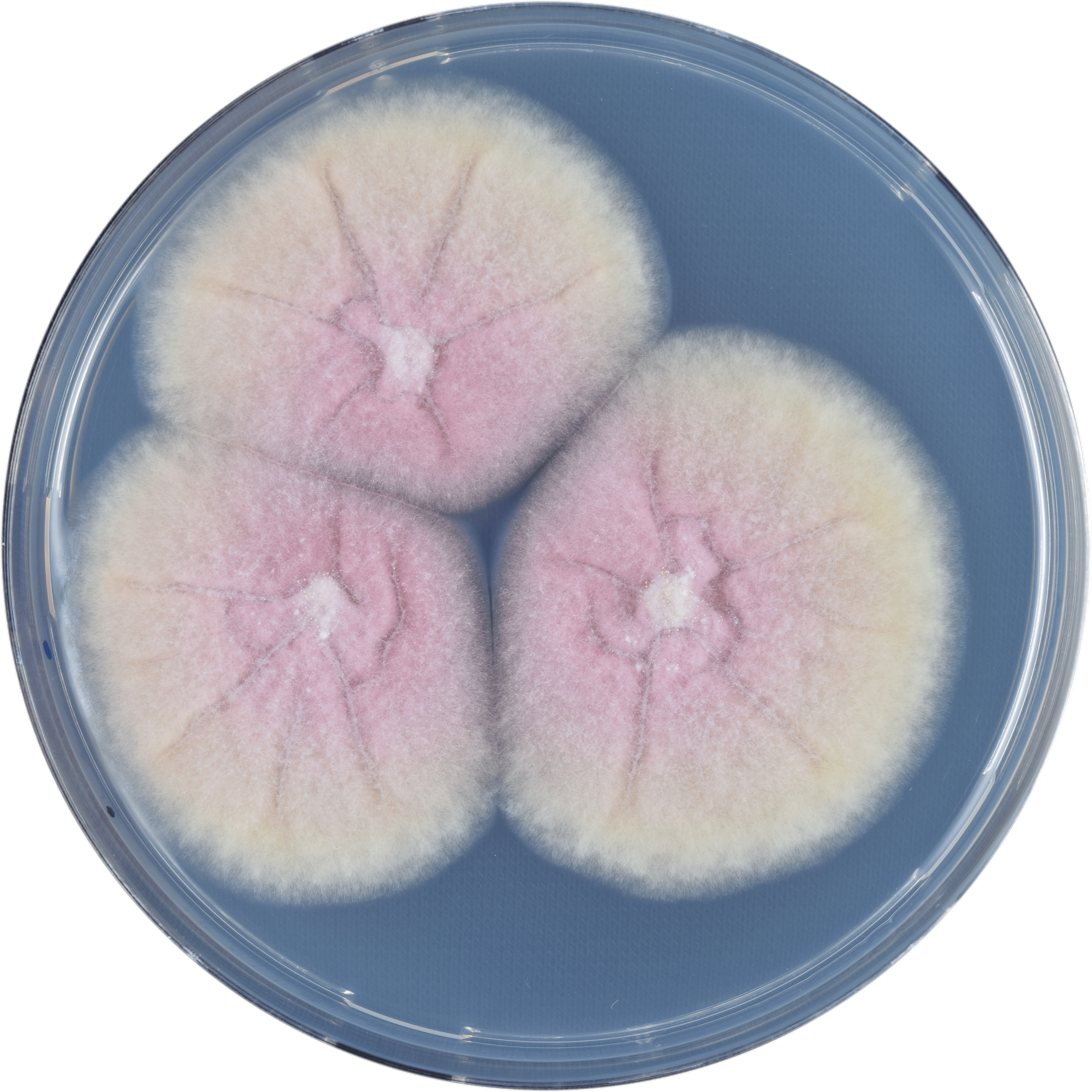
Aspergillus roseoglobulosus growing on CYA plate

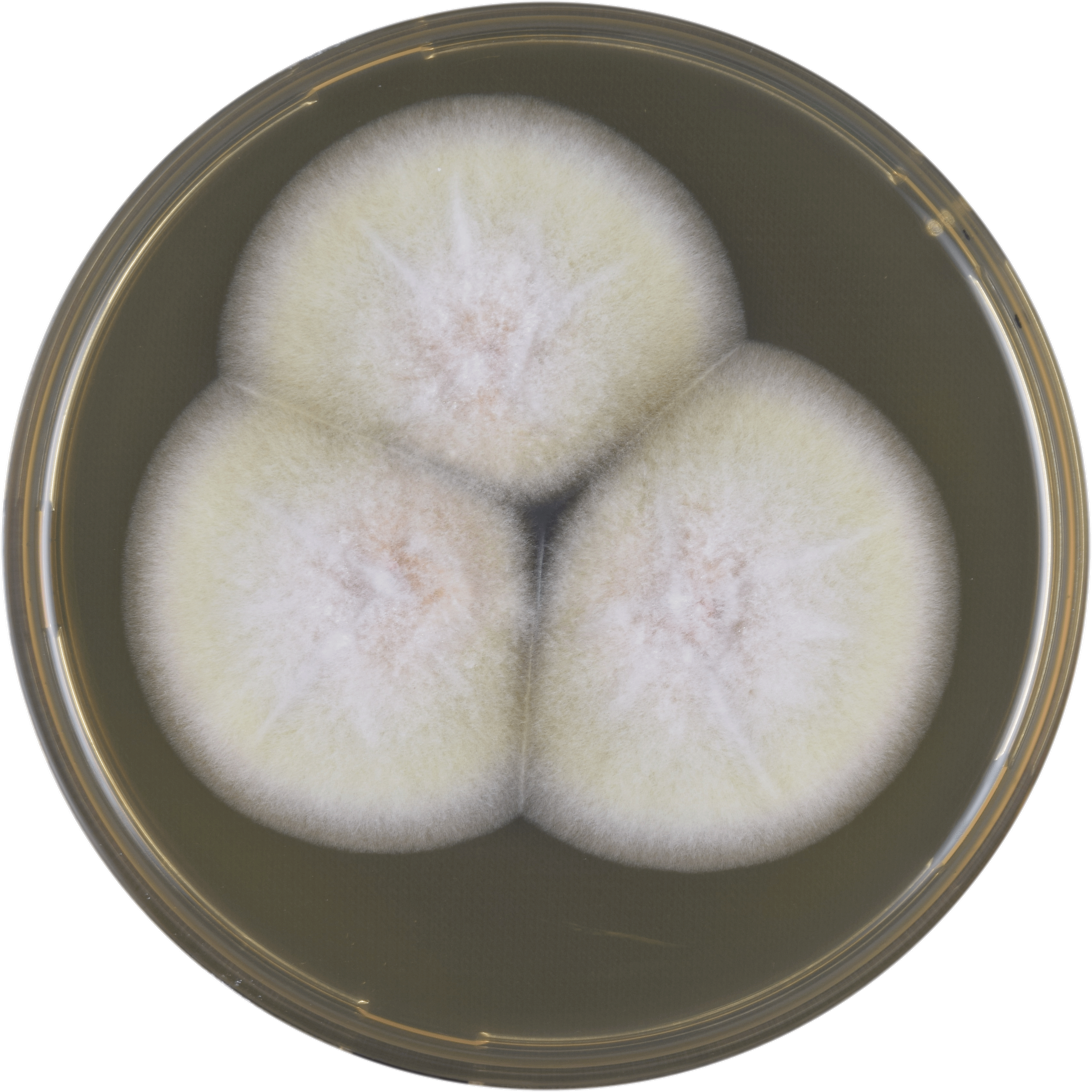
Aspergillus roseoglobulosus growing on MEAOX plate
