= Aspergillus westlandensis =

Scientific classification
- Kingdom: Fungi
- Division: Ascomycota
- Class: Eurotiomycetes
- Order: Eurotiales
- Family: Aspergillaceae
- Genus: Aspergillus
- Species: A. westlandensis

Binomial name
- Aspergillus westlandensis Visagie, Varga, Meijer & Frisvad (2014)

Species of fungus

Aspergillus westlandensis is a species of fungus in the genus Aspergillus. It is from the Circumdati section. The species was first described in 2014. It has been reported to produce aspergamide A and B, penicillic acid, dehydropenicillic acid, xanthomegnin, viomellein, vioxanthin, and traces of ochratoxin A.

== Growth and morphology ==
A. westlandensis has been cultivated on both Czapek yeast extract agar (CYA) plates and Malt Extract Agar Oxoid® (MEAOX) plates. The growth morphology of the colonies can be seen in the pictures below.

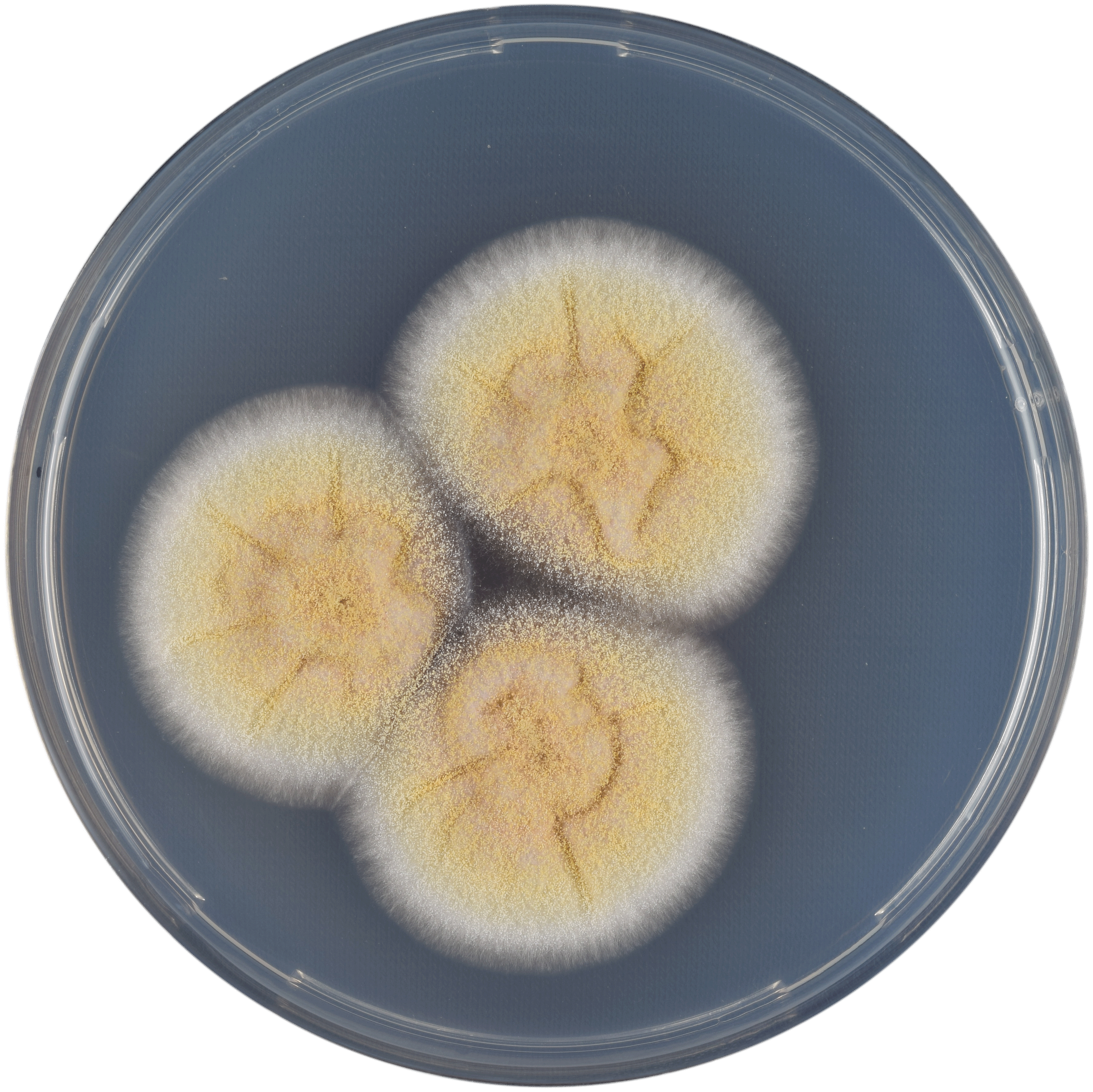
Aspergillus westlandensis growing on CYA plate

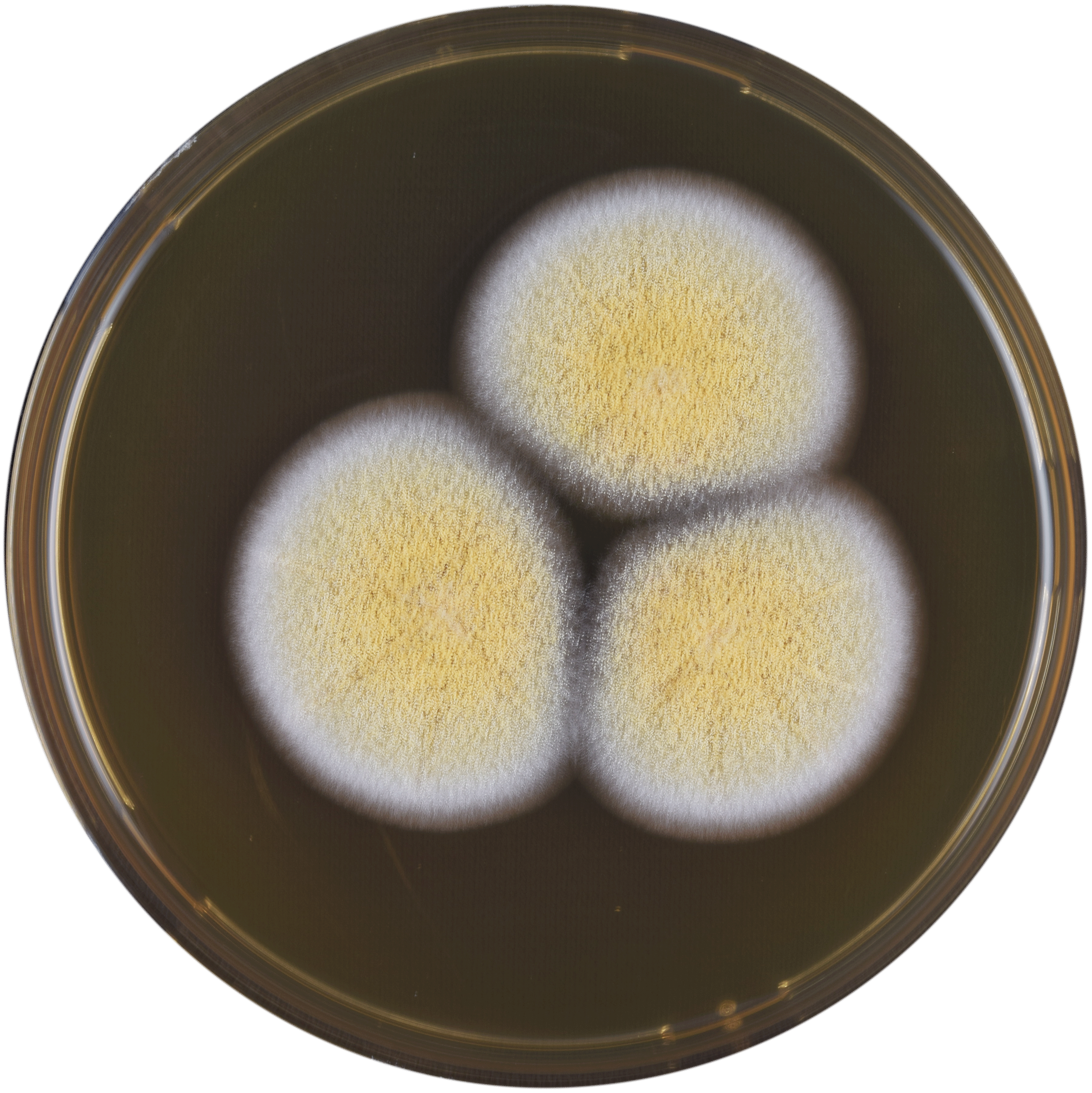
Aspergillus westlandensis growing on MEAOX plate
