= C22H12 =

The molecular formula C_{22}H_{12} (molar mass: 276.33 g/mol, exact mass: 276.0939 u) may refer to:

- Anthanthrene
- Benzo[ghi]perylene
- Triangulene, or Clar’s hydrocarbon
