= De novo mutation =

Genetic mutation not inherited from a parent

A de novo mutation is a newly present mutation in an individual organism. These may occur in gametogenesis due to a germline mutation in a parent, or as a postzygotic mutation.

== Types ==
=== Single-nucleotide polymorphism ===
Single-nucleotide polymorphisms occur when a single nucleotide base is altered within the DNA sequence. They are one of the most common forms of genetic variation and occur when one is substituted for another. There are three types of point mutations; silent mutations, missense mutations and nonsense mutations.

Silent mutation

A silent mutation occurs when a change in the nucleotide sequence does not lead to a change in the protein product. This is likely due to alteration in the 3rd coding causing redundancy. For example, the codon CUA is mutated into CUG; which still codes for leucine, therefore not making any impact towards protein function. Even if silent mutations do not impact the overall function of the protein, they are still considered de novo if they arose spontaneously, which tends to be the case in an individual's genome.

Missense mutation

A missense mutation occurs when a single nucleotide change leads to a substitution of an amino acid for another. Depending on the significance of placement, the missense mutation may be beneficial or harmful.

Nonsense mutation

A nonsense mutation causes a premature stop codon in the nucleotide sequence, which leads to a discontinuation of protein synthesis for that transcript. De novo nonsense mutations often result in genetic disorders or severe developmental conditions. A common example of de novo nonsense mutation occurs in the CFTR gene, potentially leading to cystic fibrosis. Essentially what happens is it causes a stop to the production of CFTR protein, thus leading to a build up of mucus in the organs. The most common nonsense mutation in CFTR is delta F508 but there can be others as well. This typically occurs within the germline, or early in embryonic development.

=== Indels (insertion/deletions) ===
Indels are genetic mutations which consist of two categories, insertions and deletions. Insertions are where one or more nucleotides are added, while deletions are when one or more nucleotides are removed from the sequence.

While similar, frameshift mutation is a specific type of indel where the amount of nucleotides added or deleted is not in a multiple of three codons. This is because each amino acid is made up of three codons, thus removing or adding three codons will only remove/add a singular amino acid. However, having one or two nucleotides inserted/deleted will cause not only that amino acid to change but also all the ones moving forward, resulting in a shift in the entire genetic code. The consequences of a frameshift are more severe and often lead to early termination of translation aka a nonsense mutations can arise spontaneously during DNA replication or repair, particularly in regions of the genome that are repetitive or prone to errors. When an indel occurs in a germ cell (egg or sperm), it can be passed down to the offspring as a de novo mutation, leading to the development of genetic conditions that were not present in the parents' genetic profiles.

An example of a frame shift is Huntington's disease, where a de novo insertion or deletion of a single nucleotide can impact the CAG trinucleotide repeat. This can result in heavy neurodegeneration and psychiatric symptoms. These symptoms include uncontrolled movements, emotional problems, and loss of thinking ability (cognition).The individuals have trouble walking, speaking and swallowing.

Frameshift mutations can occur as de novo mutations in both prezygotic and postzygotic stages of development. For example, if a frameshift mutation occurs during the formation of sperm or egg cells (prezygotic), it can result in a genetic disorder in the offspring, even though neither parent shows signs of the mutation.

A de novo frameshift mutation could result in a disorder like Tay–Sachs disease, where the HEXA gene undergoes a frameshift due to an indel. This mutation causes an altered enzyme that leads to the buildup of lipids in nerve cells, causing progressive neurological damage. As the disease progresses, children experience developmental regression, and by age 2 or 3, affected children often experience severe cognitive and motor decline. Most children with Tay–Sachs disease die by the age of 4 or 5 due to complications related to the disease, often respiratory failure or infections.

=== Copy number variants ===
Copy number variants are de novo mutations where large segments of DNA are duplicated or deleted. In comparison to single nucleotide variants, copy number variants usually impact large regions of the genome, thus gaining or losing this can significantly impact the cell dosage. Like many they can arise from DNA replication, recombination or through repairing double stranded breaks in the DNA.

The most prone locations of copy number variants occurrence are where the genome is rich in repetitive sequences as its more likely for DNA mechanisms to get confused and thus misaligned during replication. This leads to unequal crossing over between homologous chromosomes, resulting in some regions having extra copies while others lose some.

These types of errors can occur pre zygotically, prior to fertilization in the germ cells, or postzygotic ally in early embryonic development. When mutations occur in de novo they can result in rare genetic disorders even for individuals who have no previous family history of the condition. This highlights how spontaneous genetic changes can lead to complex diseases, ultimately contributing to human genetic diversity. Depending on where, some can be harmless while others can impact critical genetic processes.

Genetic disease example

An example of a de novo copy number variants include autism spectrum disorder. Many cases of autism are linked to de novo copy number variants, particularly small deletions and duplications in the 16p11.2 chromosomal region. Individuals with deletions exhibit developmental delays, while individual duplication tends to have problems with coordination of speech and motor skills.

Another example is schizophrenia where studies have shown that rare de novo copy number variants result in large deletions or duplications of DNA. These often disrupt genes involved in brain development affect the synaptic and neuronal development, suggesting that genetic disruptions in neural pathways contribute to the increase risk of schizophrenia. Schizophrenia is a severe mental disorder that impacts a person's thinking, emotions, and behavior. Symptoms may include hallucinations, delusions, disorganized thoughts, and negative effects such as lack of motivation and social withdrawal.

DiGeorge syndrome is a result of a de novo deletion of a portion of chromosome 22, leading to disabilities, immune system abnormalities and congenital heart defects. Alongside these issues, individuals may experience cleft palate, distinctive facial features (such as low-set ears or a small jaw), feeding difficulties, kidney problems, and low calcium levels due to endocrine dysfunction. Muscle tone may be reduced (hypotonia), and learning difficulties are common. As individuals grow older, there is also an increased risk of mental health conditions such as anxiety, ADHD, and even schizophrenia. The severity and combination of symptoms can vary widely from person to person.

Charcot–Marie–Tooth disease leads to nerve damage due to de novo duplication of PMP22 Gene. The PMP22 gene is important for building and maintaining the myelin sheath, the fatty coating that wraps around nerves and helps them send signals quickly and efficiently. Without it, nerve communication can slow down or get disrupted.

=== Chromosomal arrangements ===
Large parts of the chromosome are deleted, duplicated, indeed or exchanged between non-homologous chromosomes. Like other types of mutations, errors can occur spontaneously during meiosis (in the germline and can be passed onto offspring) or early embryonic development (will not be passed onto offspring). Chromosomal rearrangement is due to random mistakes in the DNA repair mechanism when the cell attempts to fix a double stranded break. Some key processes include non-homologous end joining (NHEJ), non-allelic homologous recombination (NAHR), or the breakage-fusion-bridge cycle.

Non-homologous end joining (NHEJ)

In the non-homologous end joining (NHEJ), This mechanism joins broken DNA ends without a template, which can lead to chromosome fusions, deletions, or insertions. This mechanism is not the most accurate causing random mutations to appear. An example is chronic myeloid leukemia. NHEJ errors lead to translocations between chromosome 9 and 22, forming a BCR-ABL fusion. This fusion causes uncontrolled growth of white blood cells, causing leukemia.

Non-allelic homologous recombination (NAHR)

The second mechanism, non-allelic homologous recombination (NAHR), occurs when DNA sequences that are highly similar but in different locations (such as repetitive regions) mistakenly recombine, causing structural variations like deletions or duplications. A common example is DiGeorge syndrome, where position 11.2 of the q arm is spontaneously deleted.

Breakage fusion cycle (BFB)

Lastly the breakage-fusion-bridge cycle (BFB) occurs when chromosome ends fuse after a break, leading to cycles of Chromosome with a broken end fuses with another chromosome, leading to repeated arrangements and lack of stability, similar to cancer. An example of this is osteosarcoma also known as bone cancer. It is caused by large chromosomal rearrangements causing a MDM2 amplification on the q arm of chromosome 12, which inhibits TP53 gene (a crucial tumor suppressor), resulting in rapid growth of a bone tumor.

== Prezygotic vs postzygotic de novo mutation ==
=== Prezygotic de novo mutation ===
Prezygotic de novo mutations are those that arise in the sperm or egg cells before fertilization, meaning that the mutation is passed on to all cells in the resulting embryo and, ultimately, the individual. Note that this mutation is not inherited from the parents, although since it spontaneously arises pre zygotically, it can be passed on from the person who acquired it to the offspring. These mutations typically occur during the formation of gametes, when DNA is being replicated and divided during meiosis. As gametes undergo division and genetic material is prepared for fertilization, errors can happen that result in mutations being carried into the zygote.

Schizophrenia

Schizophrenia is a complex psychiatric disorder influenced by both genetic and environmental factors. As men age, their sperm cells undergo numerous divisions, raising the likelihood of replication errors and subsequent de novo mutations. Studies have shown that individuals with sporadic (non-familial) schizophrenia tend to have fathers who are, on average, older than those with a familial history of the disorder. This suggests that de novo mutations arising in the sperm of older fathers may elevate the risk of schizophrenia in their children.

Achondroplasia

- Achondroplasia is a rare genetic condition that is the most common type of dwarfism. Approximately 80% of mutations that occur in the fibroblast growth factor receptor 3 (FGFR3 gene) that primarily cause this condition, are de novo.
- The mutations in FGFR3 gene follows an autosomal dominant inheritance pattern. This leads to over activation, which causes inhibition of chondrocyte proliferation. This would ultimately lead to abnormal bone growth that causes limbs to shorten and other skeletal abnormalities.
- Since its autosomal dominant, an individual with achondroplasia has a 50% chance of passing the mutated gene to their child. When both parents have achondroplasia, each pregnancy carries a 25% chance the child will have average stature (inherit two normal copies), a 50% chance the child will have achondroplasia (inherit one mutated copy), and a 25% chance the child will inherit two mutated copies, resulting in homozygous achondroplasia; a severe fatal form of the condition.

=== Post-zygotic de novo mutation ===
They are a specific type of de novo mutation that occurs after fertilization, during early embryonic development. Because of this, postzygotic de novo mutations are mostly never passed onto the offspring of the affected individual. Instead, post zygotic mutations result in genetic mosaicism. This occurs through a random mutation that appears in a single cell after fertilization. As that cell divides the mutation spread to a subset of body tissues.

In this case, only some of the individual's cells will carry the mutation, while others remain unaffected. The earlier the mutation occurs in development, the more tissues and organs will carry the mutation, influencing the severity of the condition. Since de novo mutations are genetic changes that arise spontaneously rather than being inherited from parents, post-zygotic mutations fit within this category but with an added layer of complexity. Depending on when and where the mutation occurs, its effects can range from mild to severe and can be confined to specific tissues or organs.

Proteus syndrome

Proteus syndrome is a rare disorder that's characterized by abnormal tissue overgrowth, leading to a post zygotic de novo mutation in the AKT1 gene. This impacts on some cells including overgrowth of bones, skin and connective tissues. Since the mutation occurs post zygotically, it only affects some cells which causes asymmetrical growth. An example of this would be where a patient may have one enlarged limb while the rest of the body remains normal. Depending on how early on it and the location determines the severity of the mutation.

Neurodevelopmental disorders

De novo mutations can occur post-zygotically during brain development. Unlike inherited genetic conditions, these disorders arise from spontaneous genetic mutations that were not present in the parents. The timing and location of the mutation determine its impact. The severity depends on how early in development the de novo mutation spawns; the earlier it occurs the more severe the neurological impairment would be. This is because the earlier the PZM mutation occurs, the more cells will contain the mutation as cells divide, leading to larger portions of the neuron being affected. With that knowledge, If it occurred later on, it would likely cause milder symptoms. This mosaic distribution of mutated cells explains why individuals with the same genetic mutation may have different severity levels in disorder. Some examples include epilepsy, focal cortical dysplasia, autism spectrum disorder and intellectual disabilities.

- With epilepsy and focal cortical dysplasia, mosaic mutations in the MTOR pathway cause seizures. Since these mutations only occur in part of the brain it leads to seizures in that region but the rest of the brain functions are completely normal.
- With regards to autism, if the mutation occurs early it can affect many neurons, leading to severe intellectual disability; however if occurred later, fewer brain cells are impacted leading to milder conditions.
- Due to mosaic mutations being allocated in certain parts, standard genetic tests from blood samples may not find mosaic mutations, requiring more advanced testing.

== Impact on protein function ==
Loss of function

A loss of function protein is when a mutation causes inhibition to the protein's function. This can be caused by a de novo frameshift, nonsense or splice site mutation. This disrupts the structure in some way leading to a change that results in an incomplete, degraded or dysfunctional protein.

As mentioned, a good example of an LoF mutation is found in the CFTR gene that causes cystic fibrosis. This is where a single amino acid is removed from the F508 mutation causing an improper folding of the protein. This leads to a misfolded CFTR getting recognized as defective and is degraded before reaching the cell membrane. This causes an ion and water imbalance due to thick mucus build up affecting the lungs, pancreas and other organs.

=== Gain of function ===
A gain of function protein has a mutation that often results in a protein with an enhanced or new activity that was not present in the wild type protein. This mutation causes an ongoing activation to an active site despite suppressors trying to stop it. These mutations are very common in cancer or neurological disorder.

An example is FGFR3 (Fibroblast Growth Factor Receptor 3) GoF de novo mutation causes achondroplasia (A form of Dwarfism); which regulates bone growth by limiting proliferation of chondrocyte in the growth plate. Mutation of gene can lead to overactive FGR3 that it excessively suppresses the gene leading to shorter limbs. In some cases a de novo mutation may produce a protein that interferes with the normal protein leading to dominant disease phenotype. This is commonly known as the dominant negative effect.

=== Protein structure ===
Protein structure and amino acid sequencing of protein are very significant as a de novo mutation can cause the protein to misfold or alteration to amino acid leading to aggregation or failure of it. The misfolding changes its conformation and leads to its instability. This can cause it to change its structure as well. Changes in secondary and tertiary structure can influence ligand binding, protein–protein interaction or enzymatic activity, all which can impact cellular processes. Can also alter the amino acid (AA) sequence of a protein through a de novo mutation can also significantly affect its structure and function.

=== Splicing site alterations ===
Splice site alterations are mutations that disrupt the normal removal of introns during pre-mRNA processing, leading to abnormal protein production. These mutations can cause exon skipping, intron retention, or the use of cryptic splice sites, often resulting in frameshifts, premature stop codons, or truncated proteins. Such changes can lead to loss of function (e.g., in tumor suppressor genes like BRCA1), dominant negative effects (e.g., in structural proteins like collagen), or even toxic gain of function in neurodegenerative diseases. The consequences of improper splicing are linked to numerous genetic disorders, including Duchenne muscular dystrophy, and neurofibromatosis.

== Causes ==
=== DNA repair/replication ===
==== DNA repair mechanism ====
DNA repair mechanisms are cellular processes that detect and fix damage to the DNA, ensuring the integrity of an organism's genetic material. Repair mechanisms include base excision repair (BER), which fixes small, non-helix-distorting lesions; nucleotide excision repair (NER), which removes bulky DNA lesions like thymine dimers, mismatch repair (MMR), which corrects errors made during DNA replication; and double-strand break repair (DSBR), which handles severe DNA damage like double-strand breaks through either homologous recombination (HR) or non-homologous end joining (NHEJ). These systems work to prevent mutations by identifying and repairing errors or damage before they can affect the DNA sequence.

However, when these repair mechanisms fail or are inefficient, it can lead to the accumulation of permanent genetic changes, or mutations. In cases where DNA repair processes are defective, or the damage exceeds the cell's repair capacity, de novo mutations can arise. If a mutation occurs in a gene critical for development or cellular function, it can lead to diseases or disorders, sometimes with severe consequences. For example, if the mismatch repair system (MMR) fails to correct replication errors, it can lead to the accumulation of mutations in the DNA sequence that were not present in the parental genome. Similarly, if double-strand breaks are not properly repaired by homologous recombination or non-homologous end joining, the result could be chromosomal rearrangements or point mutations in vital regions, causing the emergence of novel mutations in the offspring. These mutations are "de novo" because they originate from errors that occurred during the DNA replication or repair processes in the individual, not from inherited genetic material. The frequency of such mutations is increased when DNA repair mechanisms are compromised. De novo mutations can play a key role in various genetic diseases, including developmental disorders, neurodegenerative diseases, and cancer, often influencing the severity and nature of the condition.

==== DNA replication ====
DNA replication is the fundamental process of which a cell copies its DNA before cell division to ensure the information is being passed onto the daughter cells, Although, this process is far from perfect and can lead to DNA replication errors. De novo mutations are a result of mistakes made during the DNA replication process, where the machinery responsible for copying the DNA makes mistakes that go undetected and uncorrected. These errors can be base substitutions, insertions, deletions, or even larger structural changes in the genome. When these replication errors happen in germline cells (egg or sperm), they are passed on to the offspring as de novo mutations, leading to potential diseases or novel genetic traits that were not previously present in the parents.

=== Environmental and external factors ===
Environmental and external factors contribute significantly to the causes of de novo mutation by directly or indirectly damaging DNA sequence or structure. This ultimately leads to increasing the likelihood of mutations and weakening DNA repair mechanisms. There are several ways that environmental factors can induce a spontaneous mutation in an individual.

==== Chemical mutagens ====
Chemical mutagens such as tobacco, pesticides, industrial chemicals and pollutants can cause mutations in the DNA. An example of this is smoking tobacco. Smoking tobacco exposes individuals to a wide range of carcinogens, nitrosamines, and benzene, all of which are known to induce mutations. This can lead to alteration of structure and causation of DNA strand breaks, leading to errors during DNA replication base substitutions or frameshift mutations. Smoking related mutations are linked to lung cancer. This includes air pollution, particular sources like vehicle emission and pesticides carrying heavy chemicals such as polycyclic aromatic hydrocarbons, nitrogen oxygen, and heavy metal such as lead and arsenic. Aflatoxin is produced by certain molds that can cause de novo mutations spawning in p53 gene, a tumor suppressor. Aflatoxin induces a G-T transversion mutation in exon 7, the third codon in 249. Having a mutation in p53 is dangerous as it can inhibit its function, thus leading to progression of cancer. Similarly it can impact DNA directly, generate free radicals or influence the activity of DNA repair enzymes, The increased oxidative stress and chronic inflammation induced by pollutants can lead to both somatic and germline mutations.

==== Radiation exposure ====
Radiation exposure is also a very common way to increase likelihood of developing a de novo mutation. This can be obtained through Ionizing radiation or UV radiation. Ionizing radiation such as X rays or gamma rays) can directly damage DNA by breaking the DNA strand and create highly reactive molecules called free radicals. These radicals can modify the dna bases, leading to a spontaneous mutation arising. Ionizing radiation can directly damage DNA in germline cells. If a mutation occurs in a sperm or egg cell before fertilization, the resulting child will have a genetic mutation that neither parent had in their DNA. example. a cosmic ray hits a sperm cell's DNA, causing a point mutation. If that sperm fertilizes an egg, the mutation becomes de novo in the child. UV radiation is less powerful than ionizing radiation, but can cause two thymine bases to form covalent bonds to one another. This thymine formation is called a thymine dimer and can cause UV-induced mutations that lead to skin cancers such as melanoma if not repaired quickly.

==== Bacteria and viruses ====
Bacteria and viruses can have a crucial impact on de novo mutation. Bacterial damages such as E.coli can cause inflammation and damage. Viral infections such as HIV, hepatitis B and Hepatitis C can infect normal gene functions by integrating its genetic material into the host's DNA.

==== Diets ====
Diets high in processed foods, fat, sugar, red meat, alcohol and drugs and low in antioxidants may contribute to an increase in oxidative stress and DNA damage, leading to mutations. Similarly, obesity can result in an inflammatory environment in the body, contributing to DNA damage that could lead to mutations.

=== Aging factors ===
As we age, our bodies experience a gradual accumulation of mutations, both in our reproductive cells and throughout our tissues. For men, the relationship between age and de novo mutations is particularly pronounced. With each passing year, the sperm undergoes more divisions, increasing the chances of replication errors. Studies have shown that older fathers are more likely to pass on mutations contributing to conditions like autism or certain genetic disorders. In contrast, women's eggs are formed early in life and remain dormant, but over time, environmental factors and natural aging can still cause DNA damage, albeit at a lower rate compared to males.

Aging also affects somatic cells, which are the non-reproductive cells in our body. As we age, mutations accumulate in these cells due to errors during cell division, and the body's repair systems become less efficient at correcting these mistakes. This accumulation of mutations is strongly linked to the development of diseases like cancer. Research has shown that somatic mutation in critical genes like p53 and KRAS are common in older individuals, which contribute to the increased incidence of cancers. Cancer risk increases dramatically with age in both humans and animals due to repeated cycles of somatic mutations. These mutations, often influenced by inherited genetic variants, undergo natural selection for traits such as uncontrolled growth, tissue invasion, immune system evasion, and the ability to spread (metastasis).

Another important aspect of aging is cellular senescence, where cells stop dividing but remain metabolically active. These senescent cells can release inflammatory factors that contribute to aging and disease. They also accumulate genetic mutations over time, adding to the overall genetic instability in the body.

Mitochondrial DNA, which is inherited from the mother, also becomes more prone to mutations with age. Mitochondria produce the energy our cells need to function, but in the process, they also generate reactive oxygen species (ROS), which are harmful molecules that can damage both mitochondrial and regular DNA. Over time, this damage adds up, especially since mitochondrial DNA doesn't have the same protective features or repair systems as nuclear DNA. This buildup of damage has been closely linked to neurodegenerative diseases like Alzheimer's and Parkinson's. Alzheimer's affects memory and thinking, caused in part by the accumulation of toxic proteins in the brain that disrupt communication between nerve cells. Parkinson's leads to tremors, stiffness, and movement problems due to the loss of dopamine-producing neurons. Both diseases have been connected to problems with mitochondrial function. Sometimes, random genetic changes called de novo mutations can hit genes that are important for keeping mitochondria healthy. For example, mutations in genes like PINK1 and PARK2, which help manage damaged mitochondria, have been linked to Parkinson's. In Alzheimer's, mutations that affect how the brain processes certain proteins or handles oxidative stress can play a role too. Even without a family history, these spontaneous mutations, combined with aging and stress on our cells, can tip the balance toward disease.

Additionally, as we age, the body's ability to repair DNA declines. This includes key repair mechanisms like base excision repair and homologous recombination, which are essential for fixing DNA damage. When these systems become less efficient, mutations are more likely to persist, increasing the risk of genetic instability and related diseases.

=== Epigenetic influence on de novo ===
Epigenetics involves modifications to DNA or chromatin that affect gene expression without altering the underlying DNA sequence, and these changes can play a significant role in the occurrence of de novo mutations.

DNA methylation, which typically silences gene expression by adding a methyl group to cytosine bases, can cause disease when it occurs aberrantly, such as in cancer, where de novo DNA methylation may silence tumor suppressor genes or activate oncogenes. Histone modifications, like acetylation or methylation, regulate chromatin structure and accessibility, impacting gene expression. These modifications are reversible and influenced by environmental factors, potentially leading to long-term changes in gene expression. De novo histone modifications can cause the improper activation or silencing of genes, contributing to diseases that mimic the effects of genetic mutations.

Non-coding RNAs, including microRNAs and long non-coding RNAs, are also involved in regulating gene expression. Environmental factors can alter the expression of these non-coding RNAs, leading to changes in gene regulation similar to those caused by mutations in the DNA sequence. Furthermore, while most epigenetic marks are reset during reproduction, some can escape this reprogramming and be inherited, suggesting that de novo epigenetic changes in the germ cells could lead to altered gene expression in offspring.

Some developmental disorders, like Angelman syndrome and Prader–Willi syndrome, are caused by epigenetic changes in genomic imprinting, where genes are expressed differently depending on whether they are inherited from the mother or father. Both are acquired through a deletion mutation in the same region of chromosome 15. However Angelman syndrome occurs when parental copy UBE3A gene is inactive and there is a deletion in the chromosome 15 region of the mother gene, while PWS is vice versa.

== Technology for de novo mutations detection ==
=== Next-generation sequencing ===
Next-generation sequencing (NGS) has revolutionized genetic research by offering an efficient and easily understandable way to analyze genomes. NGS technologies are essential for detecting de novo mutations because they offer deep coverage and allow researchers to sequence both the coding and non-coding regions of the genome. NGS provides the most effective and efficient approach to distinguish these mutations from inherited variants by sequencing the genomes of both parents and the child. In addition, NGS methods can also identify mutations that may be undetected by older genetic approaches such as sanger, polymerase chain reaction and karyotyping. Common platforms include Illumina, Oxford Nanopore and PacBio. Some types of next generation sequencing is whole genome sequencing, whole exome sequencing and deep sequencing.

=== Whole genome sequencing ===
Whole genome sequencing (WGS) is the most unbiased and comprehensible way for detecting de novo mutations as it sequences the genome of an individual to its entirety, including both non-coding and coding regions. It enables research to determine a range of genetic variation including single-nucleotide polymorphism, indels, structural variants, copy number variations and non coding regions, a lot of which are missed by other mechanisms.

Advantages

- Since de novo mutations can occur anywhere, including non coding areas, WGS is the most effective method to capture all potential mutations that may contribute to disease.
- This ability allows us to develop a better understanding of mutation rate, mutation hotspots and patterns of de novo mutations across the genome, and how they contribute to the disease.
- This includes neurodevelopmental disorders including autism, rare diseases and cancer genomic. In cases of rare diseases, de no mutations are very prevalent given how the affected individuals don't have a family history of the disorder. Due to these diseases being uncommon, it tends to lack research and understanding towards it, therefore it would be harder to find and wouldn't know what section to target with the more specific genetic technologies .
- However, since WGS analyzes 100% of the genome you are likely to find potential de novo mutations and variants that contribute to the disease. WGS is essential in these situations since it allows for discovery of variants that wasn't meant to be found across the entire genome.
- In a WGS study researchers identified mutations in genes that were previously not associated with the disease. By having these types of technology new diagnostic markers for early genetic testing can be discovered thus leading to potential therapeutics targets.
- One of the most common things WGS is used for is cancer genomics. Somatic de novo mutations contribute heavily to tumorigenesis. They spontaneously arise during an individual's lifetime resulting in uncontrolled cell growth and development. WGS is good for this since somatic mutations can occur anywhere in the genome, and exome sequencing alone may miss noncoding regulatory mutations that drive cancer. Examples of this include TP53, BRCA1 and EGFR which are critical for breast cancer, lung cancer and leukemia.

Disadvantages

- One of the main limitations with WGS is that it is a costly process then more targeted approaches like WES.
- Since it analyzes the entire genome, a single WGS data set takes up a lot of storage and is more time-consuming to analyze. This storage uptake can actually be a problem as it can produce false positive mutations.
- Due to this, analysts would need to use other methods like sanger sequencing or polymerase chain reaction to confirm de novo mutations.

Improvements

As sequence technologies continue to advance, WGS is becoming more powerful. Some features that are currently being worked on/ utilized include long read sequencing and single cell WGS. Standard short reading sequencing technologies such as Illumina struggle to map repetitive regions or detect large structural variants, thus long read technologies such as PacBio and Oxford Nanopores are used to overcome this. Single cell WGS allows researchers to study a mutation in an individual cell, improving cancer heterogeneity and our understanding on mosaicism.

=== Whole exome sequencing ===
Whole exome sequencing (WES) is more specific and focuses on protein coding regions (the exonic portions of the genome). This part makes up only 1–2% of the whole genome; however, most mutations that lead to diseases occur within these coding regions.

Advantages

- WES provides a more cost efficient option in comparison to whole genome sequencing while still capturing the relevant de novo mutations leading to that disease.
- This mechanism is useful when analyzing mendelian diseases, where the focus is on understanding the role of single genes or gene variants. By sequencing both parents alongside the child, it is possible to compare the variants in the child's genome with those in the parents' genomes. Any variant in the child that is absent in both parents can be classified as a de novo mutation.
- WES is heavily used in the study of neurodevelopmental disorders, such as autism spectrum disorder, intellectual disabilities, and schizophrenia. In a large scale WES study of autism families found that de novo mutations in CHD8 were strongly associated with autism spectrum disorder, leading to dysregulated chromatin remodeling and altered gene expression during brain development.
- Has also played a role in detecting patients with undiagnosed rare diseases, where de novo mutations are often involved in the disease phenotype

Limitations

- It is only limited to coding regions, therefore missing mutations in non coding regions such as regulatory regions, introns and intergenic areas that may have had an important causing mutation especially in structural variation or gene regulation.
- For example, many regulatory mutations that influence gene expression or epigenetic changes are missed, yet they are crucial in conditions like cancer or neurodegenerative diseases.
- Additionally, WES is limited in its ability to detect structural variants, such as large insertions, deletions, and copy number variations, which are often associated with genetic disorders and cancer. These large-scale genomic alterations are better captured by Whole Genome Sequencing (WGS).

=== Ultra-deep sequencing ===
Advantages

- Ultradeep sequencing is a highly sensitive technique that sequences specific genomic regions at an extremely high read depth (typically 1000x or more), making it especially useful for detecting low-frequency de novo mutations.
- These mutations, which arise spontaneously in an individual's genome, can be difficult to detect with standard sequencing methods, particularly when they occur in only a small subset of cells.
- In the case of mosaic mutations, which arise after fertilization and result in a mixture of mutant and non-mutant cells in the body, ultra-deep sequencing provides the sensitivity required to identify even the minority cell populations harboring these mutations.
- De novo mutations, by definition, are not inherited from parents, so their detection requires careful comparison of the individual's genome to those of both parents.
- Ultra-deep sequencing enables the identification of these de novo somatic mutations in conditions such as cancer, neurodevelopmental disorders (like autism and epilepsy), and genetic syndromes, where only some cells carry the mutation, which might otherwise be overlooked in bulk tissue
- In cancer, for instance, sub clonal de novo mutations can drive tumor evolution, and their detection through ultradeep sequencing allows for a deeper understanding of the tumor's genetic landscape, aiding in treatment decisions.
- Research has shown that ultradeep sequencing can reveal heterogeneous mutations within tumors that contribute to their growth and resistance to treatment

Limitations

- While ultra-deep sequencing is a powerful tool for detecting these rare de novo mutations, it is expensive.
- It is also often limiting its use to targeted sequencing rather than whole-genome analysis.

== Mutation rate and hotspot ==
=== Rate ===
The rate at which de novo mutations occur is not static and can vary among different organisms and even among individuals. In humans, the average number of spontaneous mutations (not present in the parents) an infant has in its genome is approximately 43.86.

Various factors can influence this rate. For instance, a study in September 2019 by the University of Utah Health revealed that certain families have a higher spontaneous mutation rate than average. This finding indicates that the rate of de novo mutation can have a hereditary component, suggesting that it may "run in the family".

Additionally, the age of parents, particularly the paternal age, can significantly impact the rate of de novo mutations. Older parents, especially fathers, tend to have a higher risk of having children with de novo mutations due to the higher number of cell divisions in the male germ line as men age.

In genetic counselling, parents are often told that after having a first child with a condition caused by a de novo mutation the risk of a having a second child with the same mutation is 1 – 2%. However, this does not reflect the variation in risk among different families due to genetic mosaicism. A personalized risk assessment can now quantify people's risk, and found that the risk for most people is less than 1 in 1000.

=== Mutation hotspot ===
A mutation hotspot is a specific spot in our DNA where mutations happen more often than elsewhere. These hotspots are often tied to diseases, like cancer, and can play a role in how genetic traits develop. De novo mutations, on the other hand, are those that occur spontaneously in an individual, rather than being passed down from parents. These mutations can happen in the germline (affecting eggs or sperm) or in somatic cells (which don't get passed to offspring). Hotspots are usually found in areas of the genome with certain features, like repetitive sequences or CpG islands, which make it more likely for mistakes to happen during DNA replication. Things like exposure to radiation, chemicals, or viruses can also increase the chances of mutations at these hotspots. Mutation hotspots and de novo mutations are closely linked because these new mutations often happen at hotspots, where the DNA is more prone to errors. The way these hotspots are spread can also depend on an individual's genetic makeup, which can lead to different de novo mutations in their children.

== Role in evolution ==
De novo mutations are one of the main sources of genetic variation, which is essential for evolution. Without differences in traits, there would be nothing for natural selection to act on. Most of these mutations are neutral, meaning they don't impact an organism's survival or reproduction. However, occasionally a mutation is harmful, leading to diseases or developmental disorders, while others may be beneficial and provide a survival advantage. Over time, beneficial mutations can spread through populations, shaping species as they adapt to their environments. Mutation rates vary among species, and this affects how quickly they evolve. For example, bacteria have high mutation rates, which is why they can rapidly develop resistance to antibiotics. Humans, in contrast, have relatively low mutation rates, which slows evolutionary change.

=== How de novo mutations affect population ===
From a population genetics perspective, de novo mutations are constantly appearing, while natural selection works to eliminate harmful ones. This creates a balance between mutation and selection. Harmful mutations tend to disappear because individuals carrying them are less likely to survive and reproduce. However, if a mutation is beneficial—such as one that helps an organism resist disease; it may spread through the population via positive selection. In small populations, randomness plays a larger role; even a neutral or slightly harmful mutation can become common due to genetic drift . In larger populations, natural selection is more efficient at filtering out harmful mutations and spreading beneficial ones. Thanks to advances in genome sequencing, researchers can now track de novo mutations across generations and see how they impact human health and evolution.

=== Natural selection determines the fate of de novo mutations ===
Whether a de novo mutation becomes common depends on natural selection. If it provides a survival advantage, it can spread through a population over time. A well-known example is how bacteria develop resistance to antibiotics often through a single mutation that allows them to survive drug treatments. In humans, some genetic mutations have helped populations adapt to different environments, such as those that provide resistance to malaria or allow adults to digest lactose). However, most de novo mutations don't provide an advantage. Many are linked to disorders such as autism, schizophrenia, and certain cancers. Natural selection usually removes these harmful mutations, but some persist. Mutations that cause disease only after an individual has already reproduced, such as in Huntington's disease. Meanwhile, neutral mutations accumulate over time and serve as a "molecular clock", helping scientists estimate when different species diverged from common ancestors.

== Etymology ==
This comes from two Latin words:

- de, in this case meaning "from";
- novo, in this case the neuter ablative singular of novus, "new".
