= Nitronaphthalene =

Nitronaphthalene may refer to:

- 1-Nitronaphthalene
- 2-Nitronaphthalene
