= Penicillium coprobium =

Scientific classification
- Kingdom: Fungi
- Division: Ascomycota
- Class: Eurotiomycetes
- Order: Eurotiales
- Family: Aspergillaceae
- Genus: Penicillium
- Species: P. coprobium

Binomial name
- Penicillium coprobium Frisvad, J.C.; Filtenborg, O. 1989

Type strain
- ATCC 64630, CBS 184.88, IBT HOUT6, NRRL 13626

Species of fungus

Penicillium coprobium is an anamorph fungus species of the genus of Penicillium which produces pyripyropene A, roquefortine C, penicillic acid and patulin.

== See also ==
- List of Penicillium species
