= Aspergillus sesamicola =

Scientific classification
- Kingdom: Fungi
- Division: Ascomycota
- Class: Eurotiomycetes
- Order: Eurotiales
- Family: Aspergillaceae
- Genus: Aspergillus
- Species: A. sesamicola

Binomial name
- Aspergillus sesamicola C.M. Visagie, J.C. Frisvad & R.A. Samson (2014)

Species of fungus

Aspergillus sesamicola is a species of fungus in the genus Aspergillus. It is from the Circumdati section. The species was first described in 2014. It has been reported to produce xanthomegnin, viomellein, and vioxanthin.

== Growth and morphology ==
A. sesamicola has been cultivated on both Czapek yeast extract agar (CYA) plates and Malt Extract Agar Oxoid (MEAOX) plates. The growth morphology of the colonies can be seen in the pictures below.

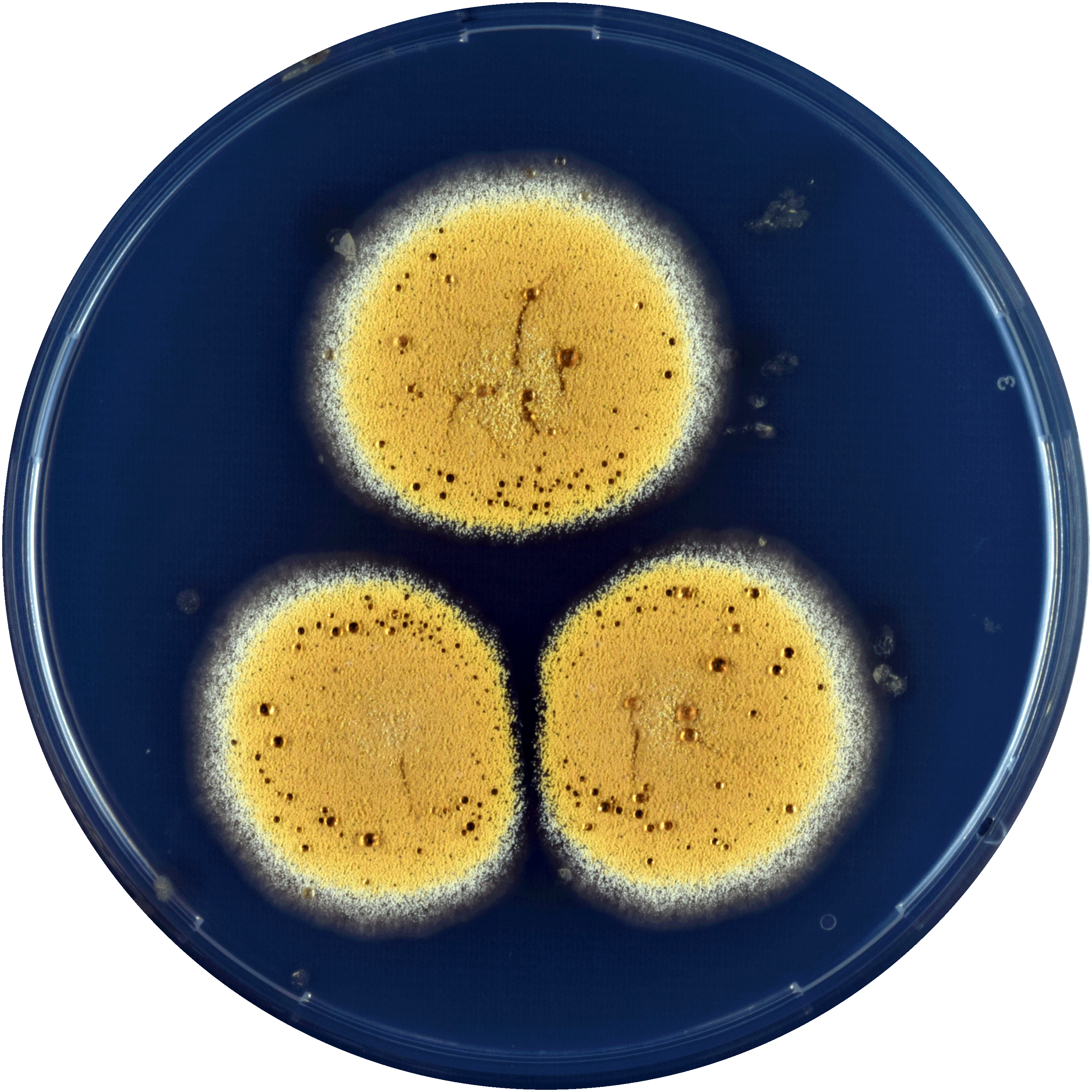
Aspergillus sesamicola growing on CYA plate

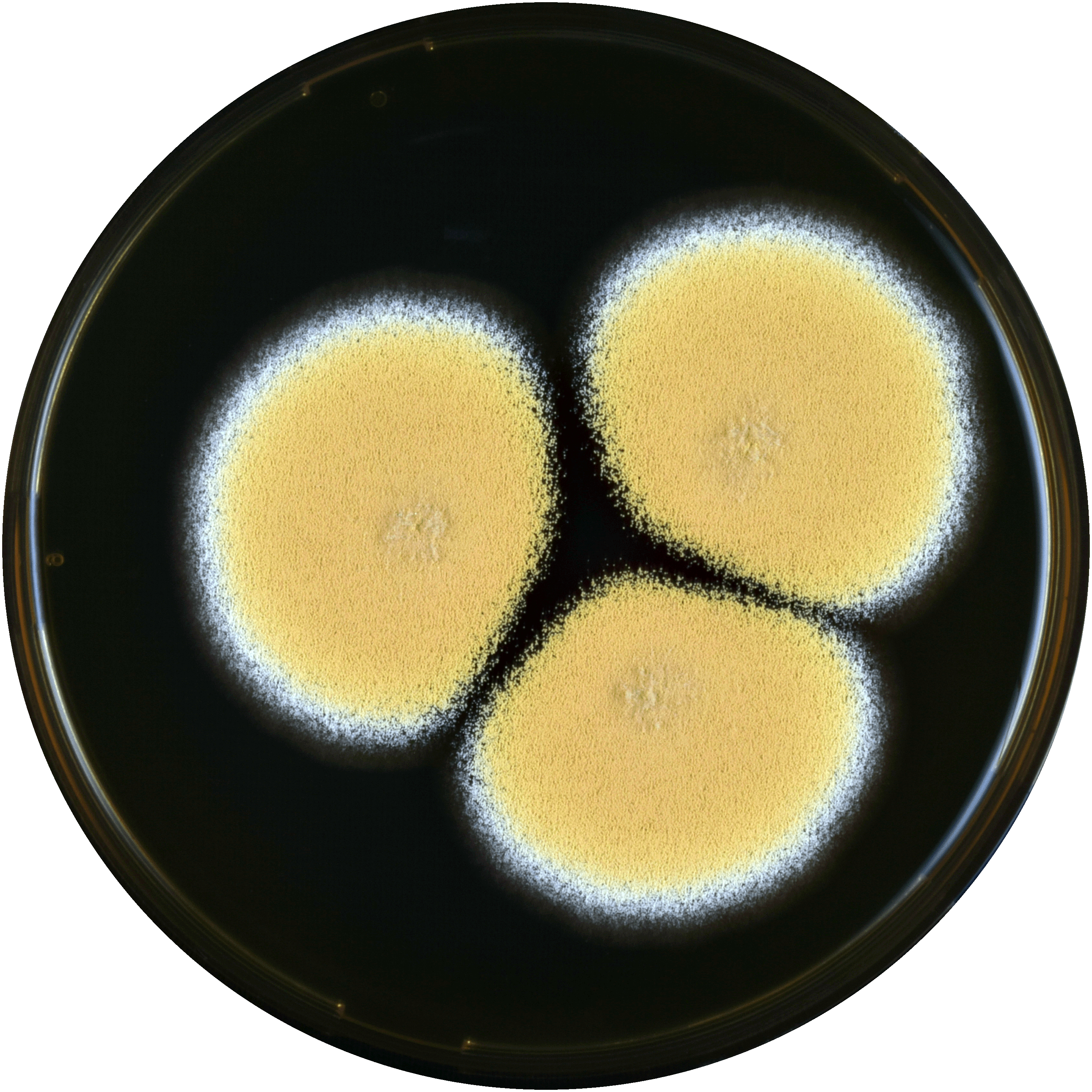
Aspergillus sesamicola growing on MEAOX plate
