= Penicillium allahabadense =

Scientific classification
- Kingdom: Fungi
- Division: Ascomycota
- Class: Eurotiomycetes
- Order: Eurotiales
- Family: Aspergillaceae
- Genus: Penicillium
- Species: P. allahabadense

Binomial name
- Penicillium allahabadense Mehrotra, B.S.; Kumar, D.A. 1962

Type strain
- ATCC 15067, CBS 304.63, CBS 453.93, FRR 3397, FRR 3761, IFO 9575, IMI 166618, JCM 9928, KCTC 6248, NBRC 9575, NRRL 3397, P 26

Synonyms
- Talaromyces allahabadensis, Penicillium korosum, Penicillium zacinthae

Species of fungus

Penicillium allahabadense is an anamorph species of the genus of Penicillium which produces rugulosin.

== See also ==
- List of Penicillium species
