= Penicillium brunneum =

Scientific classification
- Kingdom: Fungi
- Division: Ascomycota
- Class: Eurotiomycetes
- Order: Eurotiales
- Family: Aspergillaceae
- Genus: Penicillium
- Species: P. brunneum

Binomial name
- Penicillium brunneum Udagawa, S. 1959

Type strain
- ATCC 18229, B 40029, BCRC 33338, CBS 227.60, CCRC 33338, FRR 0175, FRR 0646, IFO 6438, IHEM 3907, IMI 078259, KCTC 6414, LCP 60.1601, MUCL 31318, MUCL 34587, NBRC 6438, NHL 6054, NI 6330, NRRL 175, NRRL A-9695, QM 7887

Synonyms
- Talaromyces brunneus

Species of fungus

Penicillium brunneum is an anamorph fungus species of the genus of Penicillium which was isolated in imported rice an produces rugulosin a substance which is hepatocarcinogenic to mice and rats.

== See also ==
- List of Penicillium species
