= Xanthoparmelia inopinata =

Scientific classification
- Kingdom: Fungi
- Division: Ascomycota
- Class: Lecanoromycetes
- Order: Lecanorales
- Family: Parmeliaceae
- Genus: Xanthoparmelia
- Species: X. inopinata

Binomial name
- Xanthoparmelia inopinata Elix (2006)
- Holotyp: near Bruce Rock, Western Australia

Species of lichen

Xanthoparmelia inopinata is a little-known species of saxicolous (rock-dwelling) foliose lichen in the family Parmeliaceae. It occurs in Western Australia.

== Taxonomy ==
Xanthoparmelia inopinata was scientifically described by the lichenologist John Elix in 2006. The specific epithet inopinata is derived from the Latin word for "unexpected", referencing the surprising presence of prominent effigurate maculae (shapeless spots) and isidia, features that are not commonly observed together in the genus Xanthoparmelia.

== Description ==
Xanthoparmelia inopinata features a foliose (leafy), adnate to tightly adnate thallus that can grow up to 4–5 cm wide. The lobes are contiguous to imbricate (overlapping), somewhat irregular in shape, irregularly branched, and range from 2–4 mm in width. The upper surface is yellow-green, more or less flat to undulate (wavy), featuring effigurate maculae (shapeless spots) and becoming dull, rugulose (wrinkled), and areolate in the centre. The lichen lacks soredia but possesses dense isidia that are spherical initially then become somewhat cylindrical and coralloid branched. The medulla is white while the lower surface is smooth and black with moderately dense, simple, slender black rhizines up to 0.5 mm long. Apothecia and pycnidia were not observed to occur in X. inopinata

== Habitat and distribution ==
This species is found growing on granite in Western Australia, specifically noted at a location 2 km east of Bruce Rock township. The habitat is characterised by granite monoliths amidst remnants of Eucalyptus, Casuarina, and Acacia. As of its original description, Xanthoparmelia inopinata was known only from its type locality.

Chemical analysis of the lichen shows the presence of usnic acid (minor), atranorin (trace), protocetraric acid (major), virensic acid (minor), and trace amounts of fumarprotocetraric acid, conprotocetraric acid, and vioxanthin. In chemical spot tests, the cortex reacts K− while the medulla reacts K+ (pale yellow turning to brown), C−, and P+ (orange-red).

== See also ==
- List of Xanthoparmelia species
