= Quinaldate 4-oxidoreductase =

quinaldate 4-oxidoreductase

Identifiers
- EC no.: 1.3.99.18
- CAS no.: 149885-77-8

Databases
- IntEnz: IntEnz view
- BRENDA: BRENDA entry
- ExPASy: NiceZyme view
- KEGG: KEGG entry
- MetaCyc: metabolic pathway
- PRIAM: profile
- PDB structures: RCSB PDB PDBe PDBsum
- Gene Ontology: AmiGO / QuickGO
Search
- PMC: articles
- PubMed: articles
- NCBI: proteins

In enzymology, quinaldate 4-oxidoreductase (EC 1.3.99.18) is an enzyme that catalyzes the chemical reaction

quinaldic acid
+ electron acceptor
H_{2}O
H_{2}O
kynurenic acid
+ reduced acceptor

The three substrates of this enzyme are quinaldic acid, an electron acceptor, and water. Its products are kynurenic acid and reduced acceptor.

This enzyme belongs to the family of oxidoreductases, specifically those acting on the CH-CH group of donor with other acceptors. The systematic name of this enzyme class is quinoline-2-carboxylate:acceptor 4-oxidoreductase (hydroxylating). This enzyme is also called quinaldic acid 4-oxidoreductase.
