= C5H8N2O3 =

The molecular formula C_{5}H_{8}N_{2}O_{3} (molar mass: 144.13 g/mol, exact mass: 144.0535 u) may refer to:

- Nitrosoproline
