= Ripazepam =

Chemical compound

Identifiers
- IUPAC name: 1-ethyl-3-methyl-8-phenyl-4,6-dihydropyrazolo[4,3-e][1,4]diazepin-5-one
- CAS Number: 26308-28-1
- PubChem CID: 33474
- ChemSpider: 30896
- UNII: 92000WH9C9
- KEGG: C19518
- ChEBI: CHEBI:82529
- ChEMBL: ChEMBL159298
- CompTox Dashboard (EPA): DTXSID1021245

Chemical and physical data
- Formula: C_{15}H_{16}N_{4}O
- Molar mass: 268.320 g·mol^{−1}
- 3D model (JSmol): Interactive image
- SMILES: CCN1C2=C(C(=N1)C)NC(=O)CN=C2C3=CC=CC=C3
- InChI: InChI=1S/C15H16N4O/c1-3-19-15-13(10(2)18-19)17-12(20)9-16-14(15)11-7-5-4-6-8-11/h4-8H,3,9H2,1-2H3,(H,17,20); Key:YFHYNLHGFKXAIQ-UHFFFAOYSA-N

Ripazepam is a pyrazolodiazepinone derivative structurally related to certain benzodiazepine drugs, especially zolazepam. It has anxiolytic effects.

== See also ==
- Benzodiazepine
