= Phenicarbazide =

Chemical compound

Clinical data
- Other names: 1-Phenylsemicarbazide; Kryogenin
- ATC code: none

Identifiers
- IUPAC name: 2-Phenylhydrazinecarboxamide
- CAS Number: 103-03-7
- ChemSpider: 54963
- UNII: 1LR2578324
- KEGG: C19498
- CompTox Dashboard (EPA): DTXSID9020245
- ECHA InfoCard: 100.002.794

Chemical and physical data
- Formula: C_{7}H_{9}N_{3}O
- Molar mass: 151.169 g·mol^{−1}
- InChI: InChI=1S/C7H9N3O/c8-7(11)10-9-6-4-2-1-3-5-6/h1-5,9H,(H3,8,10,11); Key:AVKHCKXGKPAGEI-UHFFFAOYSA-N

Phenicarbazide is a semicarbazide and an antipyretic substance. It is carcinogenic in mice.

== Preparation ==
Phenicarbazide can be obtained by mixing phenylhydrazine with acetic acid in aqueous solution with the addition of potassium cyanide. It is also obtained from the reaction of phenylhydrazine with urea.

== Properties ==
Phenicarbazide is a flammable, hard to ignite, crystalline, beige solid that is practically insoluble in water. It decomposes on heating.

== Uses ==
Phenicarbazide is an intermediate in the syntheses of a series of chemical compounds by cyclocondensation reactions. It was investigated as an analgesic and antipyretic in the 1970s and was used in combination preparations.
