= Aspergillus ostianus =

Scientific classification
- Kingdom: Fungi
- Division: Ascomycota
- Class: Eurotiomycetes
- Order: Eurotiales
- Family: Aspergillaceae
- Genus: Aspergillus
- Species: A. ostianus

Binomial name
- Aspergillus ostianus Wehmer (1899)

Species of fungus

Aspergillus ostianus is a species of fungus in the genus Aspergillus. It is from the Circumdati section. The species was first described in 1899. It has been reported to produce ochratoxin A.

== Growth and morphology ==
A. ostianus has been cultivated on both Czapek yeast extract agar (CYA) plates and Malt Extract Agar Oxoid® (MEAOX) plates. The growth morphology of the colonies can be seen in the pictures below.

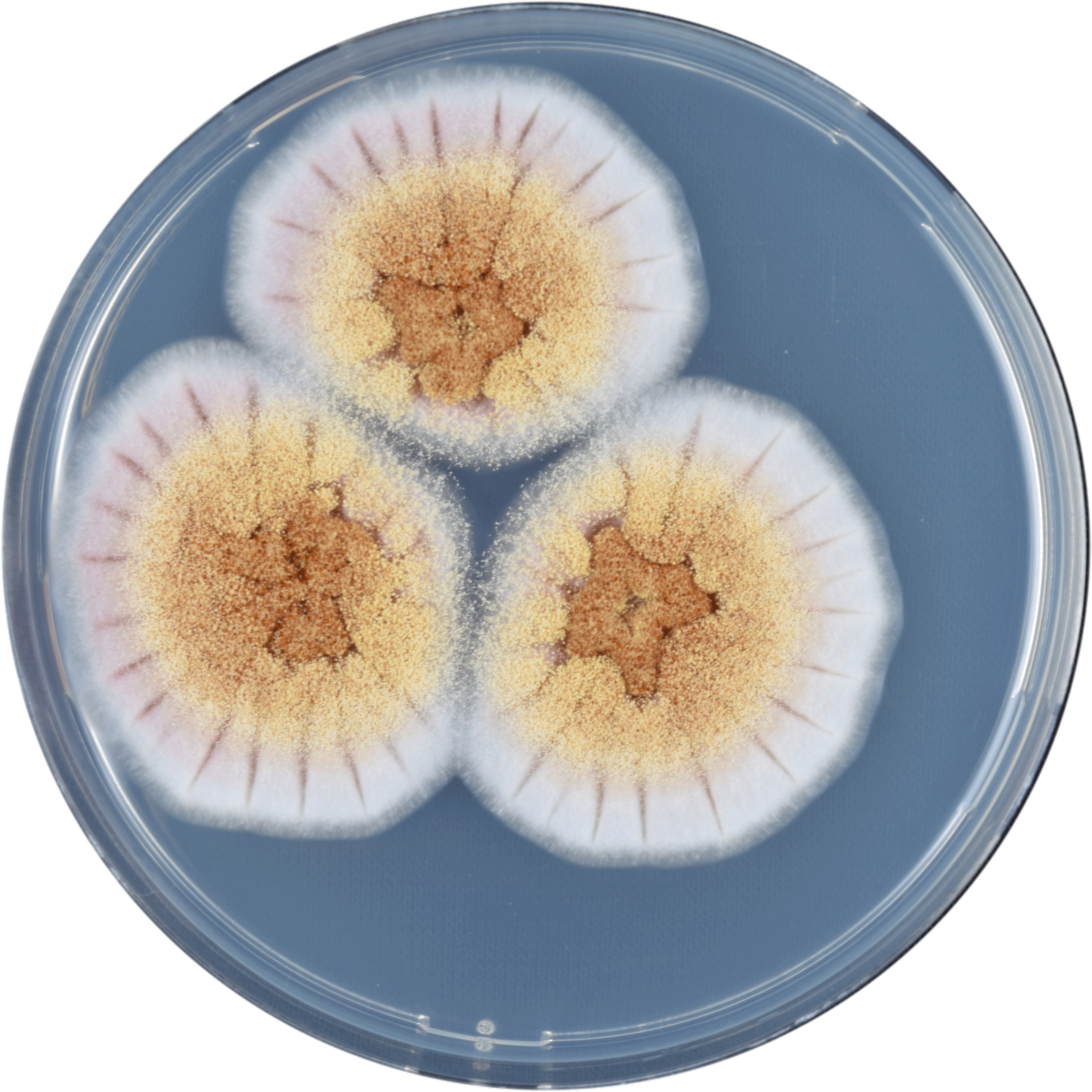
Aspergillus ostianus growing on CYA plate

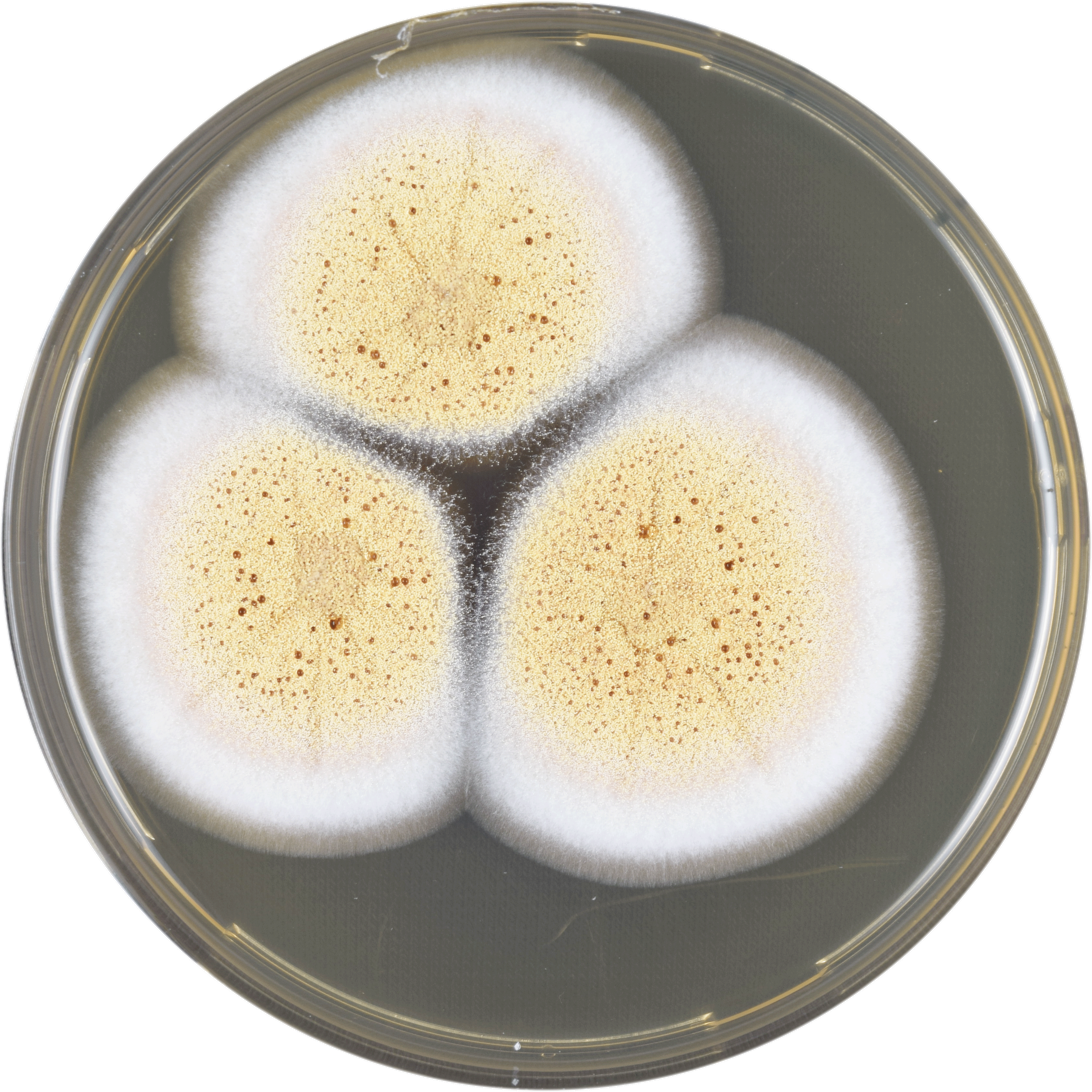
Aspergillus ostianus growing on MEAOX plate
