= Rugulosuvine =

Rugulosuvine B

Rugulosuvines are bio-active alkaloids made by Penicillium, that belongs to a class of naturally occurring 2,5-diketopiperazines.

== Notes ==
- Kozlovskiĭ AG, Adanin VM, Dahse HM, Grafe U (2001). "[Rugulosuvines A and B--diketopiperazine alkaloids from Penicillium rugulosum and Penicillium piscarium fungi]". Prikladnaia Biokhimiia I Mikrobiologiia (in Russian). 37 (3): 292–6. PMID 11443897.
- CID 3083399 from PubChem
