= Anthanthrene =

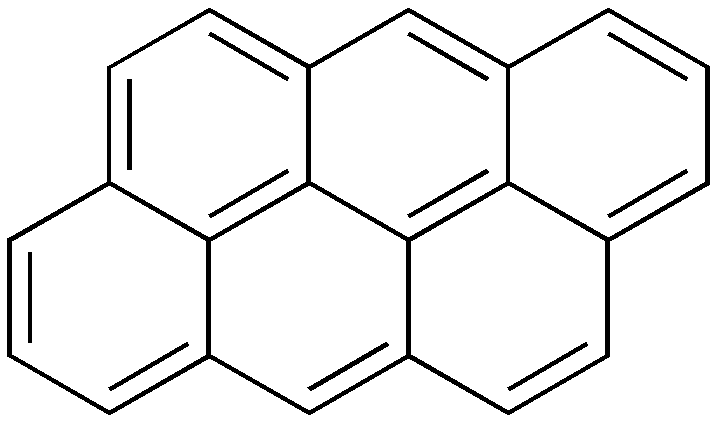
- Skeletal formula

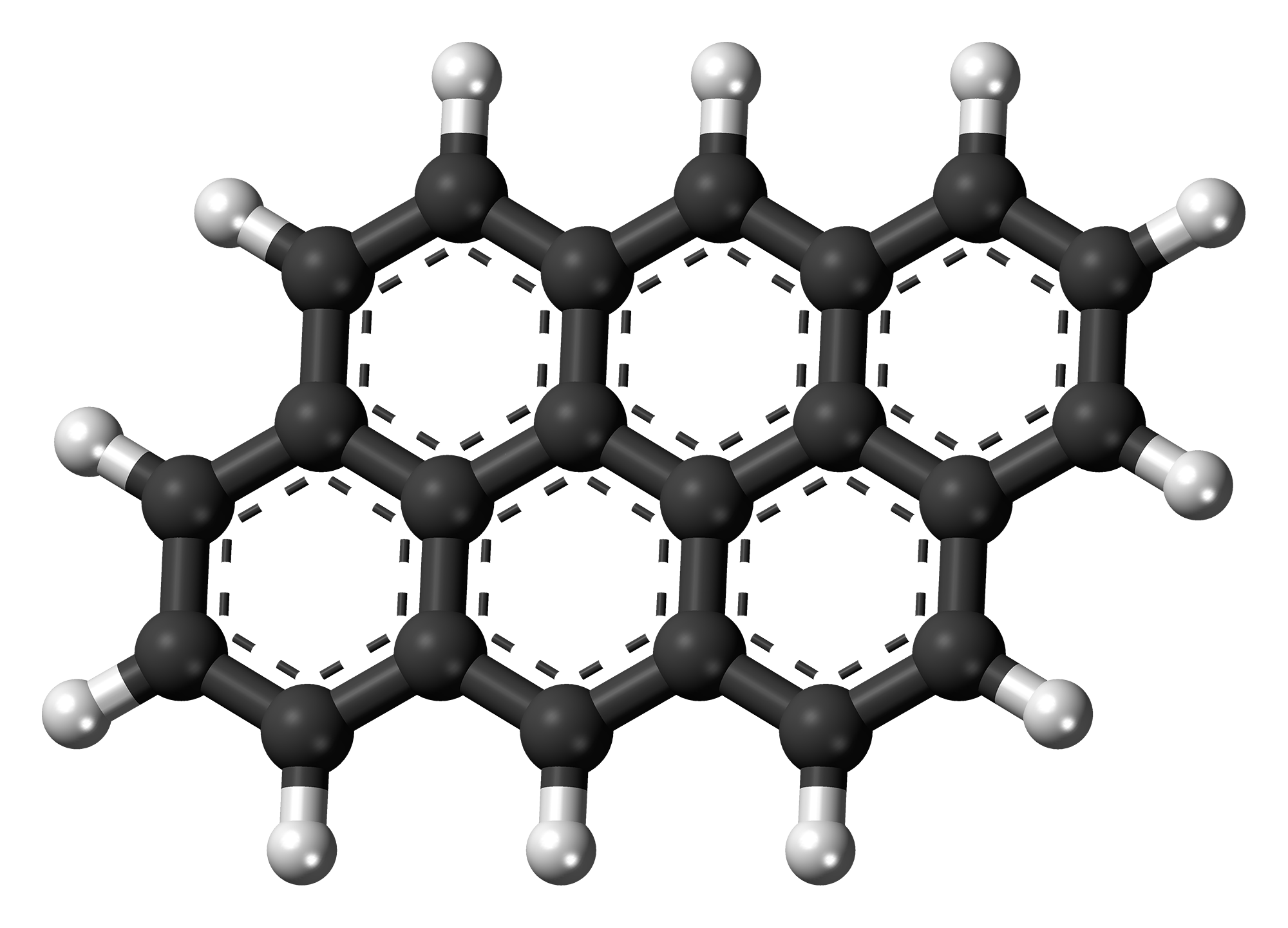

Names
- IUPAC name hexacyclo[11.7.1.1.0.0.0]docosa-1,3(8),4,6,9,11,13,15,17(21),18,20(22)-undecaene
- Preferred IUPAC name Naphtho[7,8,1,2,3-nopqr]tetraphene
- Other names Dibenzo[def,mno]chrysene; Anthanthren; Dibenzo[cd,jk]pyrene

Identifiers
CAS Number	191-26-4
3D model (JSmol)	Interactive image
ChEBI	CHEBI:82389
ChemSpider	8764
ECHA InfoCard	100.005.351
KEGG	C19327
PubChem CID	9118
UNII	L65OZG189H
CompTox Dashboard (EPA)	DTXSID9075452
- InChI: InChI=1S/C22H12/c1-3-13-7-9-18-12-16-6-2-4-14-8-10-17-11-15(5-1)19(13)21(18)22(17)20(14)16/h1-12H Key: YFIJJNAKSZUOLT-UHFFFAOYSA-N; InChI=1/C22H12/c1-3-13-7-9-18-12-16-6-2-4-14-8-10-17-11-15(5-1)19(13)21(18)22(17)20(14)16/h1-12H Key: YFIJJNAKSZUOLT-UHFFFAOYAI
- SMILES: c6c3ccc2cc1cccc5c1c4c2c3c(cc4cc5)cc6

Properties
Chemical formula	C_{22}H_{12}
Molar mass	276.33 g/mol
Appearance	Golden yellow solid
Melting point	261 °C (502 °F; 534 K)
Solubility in water	Insoluble
Magnetic susceptibility (χ)	−204.2·10^{−6} cm^{3}/mol
- Except where otherwise noted, data are given for materials in their standard state (at 25 °C [77 °F], 100 kPa). verify (what is ?) Infobox references

Anthanthrene (dibenzo[def,mno]chrysene) is a polycyclic aromatic hydrocarbon (PAH) primarily formed during the incomplete combustion of organic materials such as fossil fuels, wood, and tobacco. It is a golden-yellow, odorless solid, and is often released as solid particulate matter attached to soot or aerosols. Unlike other PAH molecules, it lacks a "bay region", a structural pocket that increases reactivity of the molecule. Due to its high lipophilicity, anthanthrene has low water-solubility, and tends to accumulate in lipid-rich environments.

Anthanthrene is mainly used as a research chemical, and is a promising candidate for organic light emitting diodes (OLEDs). However, it has been shown to contribute to free radical formation and induction of DNA strand breaks, even before external metabolic activation, suggesting carcinogenic and mutagenic risks.

== Structure and reactivity ==
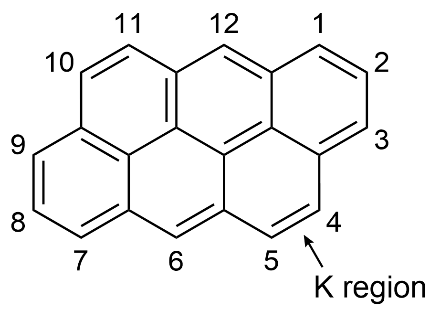
The numbered structural formula of anthanthrene with its K region indicated at carbon 4 and 5.

PAHs often include bay, fjord, K, and L regions, all of which play an important role in the reactivity of these compounds. However, anthanthrene does not contain any bay, fjord or L regions, and only contains a reactive K region at carbon 4 and 5 A K region is a region where the carbon-carbon bond has an ordinary double-bond character and can thus take part in addition reactions.

Besides structural conditions, reactivity is also dependent on chemical conditions. For chemical conversion to its (toxic) metabolites, the K region needs to be in contact with a P450 enzyme. L regions can interfere with the conversion of the K region by initiating other types of reactions instead, so, for metabolites to form, the K region should be sufficiently active, and it should not be hindered by an active L region. Since anthanthrene does not have this L region, the K region can theoretically react unimpeded, forming carcinogenic epoxides alongside other metabolic products.

Though there is limited evidence of anthanthrene causing cancer in humans, repeated exposure has been shown to cause skin cancer in mice. Two other studies found anthanthrene to be mutagenic to human cells and able to cause DNA damage. However, there is some debate as to whether anthanthrene is truly carcinogenic. One study found that the compound is biologically inactive, even though it meets the criteria that the researchers set for carcinogenicity in PAHs. The research hypothesizes that the inactivity is caused by two very reactive carbons (11 and 12) that interfere with the epoxide formation in the K region, but suggest more research is needed. Currently, there is no known antidote for anthanthrene exposure, and PAH exposure is typically handled by symptomatic treatment.

== Exposure ==
When individuals are rarely exposed to isolated anthanthrene, but rather to a complex mixture of several PAHs including anthanthrene. Anthanthrene and other PAHs get released into the atmosphere by the incomplete combustion of organic materials by humans, such as industrial emissions, vehicle exhaust gas, and cigarette smoke, as well as non-human sources such as forest fires and volcanic eruptions. Anthanthrene exposure mostly occurs through inhalation of polluted air, cigarette smoke, or ingestion of food.

Some professions are exposed to higher levels of PAHs, including anthanthrene. Professions with the highest exposure (>10 μg/m^{3} ) occur in aluminum work, manufacturing of carbon electrodes, handling of molten tar or pitch, chimney sweeping, and timber impregnation. Currently, there are no established specific exposure limits for anthanthrene. However, regulatory agencies often set limits for PAHs as a group.

== Environmental effects ==
Because PAHs such as anthanthrene have very apolar structures, they can be tightly absorbed to organic compounds in soils and sediments, making them less accessible for biodegradation by microorganisms. However, PAHs can disappear from the soil by flushing into groundwater, irreversible sorption to soil organic matter, volatilisation, photooxidation, abiotic losses, uptake by plants, or microbial degradation.

The uptake of PAHs by plants is dependent on the type of plant, environmental conditions, and the solubility of the PAH. Smaller PAHs will be less hydrophobic and more soluble in water, making it easier for root uptake and translocation. PAHs can also enter plants in a gaseous state via foliar uptake. A plant with a high lipid content has a higher tendency to bind PAHs. PAHs can absorb on the leaf wax's lipophilic surface and can enter internal components of the leaf, so plants that have a large leaf surface area have a higher potential for absorption and accumulation of PAHs. PAHs have a negative effect on the plant's growth and development.

Aquatic organisms are sensitive to contamination by PAHs via direct exposure to contaminated water, sediments, and plants. PAHs will mostly reside in their skin tissues, restricting the organism's metabolism causing biotransformation to occur through food chains. PAHs persisting in soils and sediments leads to constant contamination of aquatic organisms and plants bioaccumulation and biomagnification.

== Biotransformation ==
Three different pathways have been identified for the biotransformation of anthanthrene in bacteria: pathway I, II, and III. These pathways lead to different types of metabolites. Though these metabolites are often simply excreted, they still pose a risk of toxicity.

=== Pathway I ===
In pathway I, metabolites are produced through an epoxide formation between the carbons in the K-region. This pathway is enzymatically catalyzed by the cytochrome P450 2B subfamily, which is responsible for monooxygenation. The metabolites 4,5-dihydrodiol, 9-phenol-4,5-dihydrodiol and phenol-dihydrodiol are formed by the enzyme epoxide hydrolase. This enzyme detoxifies the genotoxic 4,5-epoxide formed at the K region.

=== Pathway II ===
In pathway II, polynuclear quinones are formed. This pathway uses autoxidation as the means of catalysis, and thus the conversion to 1,6-quinone, 3,6-quinone (genotoxic) and 6,12-quinone happens by oxidation through one electron.

=== Pathway III ===
Metabolites formed in pathway III are mono- and diphenols. Similar to Pathway I, Pathway III proceeds via enzymatic catalysis, though in this instance the P450 subfamily is 1A. This group of enzymes causes monooxygenation at the ring in anthanthrene with carbons 1, 2 and 3 (the ring on the top right), leading to the formation of mono- and diphenols by further oxidation.

== Molecular mechanism of action ==
Molecules such as benzo[a]pyrene and chrysene, which are chemically similar to anthanthrene, have binding affinity to the blood protein albumin, allowing transport through the body. This hints that anthanthrene could also be transported through the body mediated by albumin, though there is no experimental proof of this. It is suspected that anthanthrene is primarily metabolized in the liver.

Research suggests that anthanthrene 4,5-epoxide and the 3-hydroxyanthanthrene are the metabolites of anthanthrene that are most mutagenic.

=== Anthanthrene 4,5-epoxide ===
The epoxide ring at the 4,5-position is highly strained and electrophilic, making it susceptible to nucleophilic attack by DNA bases, particularly the N7 position of guanine, which results in DNA adducts. If not repaired, these adducts can lead to replication errors, base substitutions (e.g., G→T transversions), and strand breaks, contributing to carcinogenesis.

=== 3-Hydroxyanthanthrene ===
3-Hydroxyanthanthrene is further biotransformed into multiple quinones, primarily 3,6-quinone. These quinones are electrophilic, making it possible to react with nucleophiles like DNA bases. The primary site of attack is the guanine at the N7 position, but adenine (N3) and cytosine (N3) can also be involved. The attack on the DNA base causes DNA adducts which lead to replication errors, base substitutions (e.g. G→T transversions), and strand breaks, contributing to carcinogenesis.

Much of the current understanding of anthanthrene's molecular mechanism of action is inferred from studies on similar PAHs. Direct experimental evidence specific to anthanthrene is limited, and further research is needed to confirm its toxic effects.

== Degradation ==
Through biotransformation, anthanthrene is converted into various metabolites. In rats, these have been found to primarily be 3-hydroxyanthanthrene and anthanthrene 3,6-quinone. Further metabolic processing yields additional metabolites that have been described before, with significantly increased water solubility compared to the original compound. This allows for excretion through 3 routes: bile, feces, and urine.

PAHs, in general, are mostly excreted through bile, and less in feces and urine. For example, studies on benzo[a]pyrene showed that bile "accounts for [excretion of] approximately 60% of an intravenous dose, while urinary excretion represented only about 3%". This pattern is in general true for higher molecular weight PAHs, like anthanthrene and benzo[a]pyrene. Unfortunately, studies specifically focusing on anthanthrene excretion are limited.

Studies on other PAHs have shown altering urinary excretion percentages, with phenanthrene, pyrene, and benzo[a]pyrene having urinary excretion efficiencies of 40.4%, 11.4%, and 6.3%, respectively. Anthanthrene's urinary excretion rate likely falls on the low side, like benzo[a]pyrene, because of its high molecular weight.

Glucuronic acid conjugates of PAH metabolites in the gastrointestinal tract can be broken down by microorganisms. These metabolites are then released and can be reabsorbed in a process called enterohepatic circulation. This could be happening for anthanthrene metabolites as well, allowing for longer exposure times in the body. Half-life data are unavailable for anthanthrene, but other studies on PAHs show relatively rapid excretion. Research on urinary PAH metabolites has shown that 58-79% of urinary OH-PAHs are often excreted within the first 12 hours after exposure. It is expected that smaller PAHs will be excreted faster than larger PAHs, such as anthanthrene.
