= Nitrosoproline =

Names
- IUPAC name 1-Nitroso-L-proline
- Other names N-Nitrosoproline; Proline nitric oxide; Proline NO

Identifiers
CAS Number	7519-36-0
3D model (JSmol)	Interactive image
ChemSpider	8594734
KEGG	C19485
PubChem CID	10419304
UNII	F8MI03SGY0
CompTox Dashboard (EPA)	DTXSID3021061
- InChI: InChI=1S/C5H8N2O3/c8-5(9)4-2-1-3-7(4)6-10/h4H,1-3H2,(H,8,9)/t4-/m0/s1 Key: WLKPHJWEIIAIFW-BYPYZUCNSA-N; InChI=1/C5H8N2O3/c8-5(9)4-2-1-3-7(4)6-10/h4H,1-3H2,(H,8,9)/t4-/m0/s1 Key: WLKPHJWEIIAIFW-BYPYZUCNBF
- SMILES: O=C(O)[C@H]1N(N=O)CCC1

Properties
Chemical formula	C_{5}H_{8}N_{2}O_{3}
Molar mass	144.130 g·mol^{−1}
- Except where otherwise noted, data are given for materials in their standard state (at 25 °C [77 °F], 100 kPa). Infobox references

Nitrosoproline is a nitroso derivative of the amino acid proline.

It can be created in a lab by reacting a nitrite with certain amino acids.
