= Replication error phenotype =

Subgroup of tumors

The positive replication error phenotype (RER+) defines a subgroup of tumors that have been documented well in Hereditary nonpolyposis colorectal cancer (HNPCC). More recently, this phenotype also has been described in breast carcinoma and is a predictor of metastases.
