= Quinaldic acid =

Names
- IUPAC name quinoline-2-carboxylic acid
- Other names 2-Carboxyquinoline; 2-Quinolinecarboxylic acid

Identifiers
CAS Number	93-10-7
3D model (JSmol)	Interactive image
Beilstein Reference	126322
ChEBI	CHEBI:18386
ChEMBL	ChEMBL1160559
DrugBank	DB02428
ECHA InfoCard	100.002.018
EC Number	202-218-3
Gmelin Reference	143145
KEGG	C06325
PubChem CID	7124
UNII	P90NWT719R
CompTox Dashboard (EPA)	DTXSID6059079
- InChI: InChI=1S/C10H7NO2/c12-10(13)9-6-5-7-3-1-2-4-8(7)11-9/h1-6H,(H,12,13) Key: LOAUVZALPPNFOQ-UHFFFAOYSA-N
- SMILES: C1=CC=C2C(=C1)C=CC(=N2)C(=O)O

Properties
Chemical formula	C_{10}H_{7}NO_{2}
Molar mass	173.171 g·mol^{−1}
Solubility in water	14000 mg/L

Hazards
- GHS labelling
Pictograms	(GHS07: Exclamation mark)
Signal word	Warning
Hazard statements	H315, H319, H335
Precautionary statements	P261, P264, P264+P265, P271, P280, P302+P352, P304+P340, P305+P351+P338, P319, P321, P332+P317, P337+P317, P362+P364, P403+P233, P405, P501
- Except where otherwise noted, data are given for materials in their standard state (at 25 °C [77 °F], 100 kPa). Infobox references

Quinaldic acid is an organic chemical compound.

Quinaldic acid can form a zwitterion, where a proton is transferred from the carboxylic acid group to the nitrogen atom. Neptunium and uranium can form mixed ligand compounds with quinaldic acid.

Quinaldic acid has been used in the gravimetric analysis of uranium in the form of uranyl ion. This is precipitated by forming an insoluble salt with quinaldic acid. When incinerated U_{3}O_{8} is formed and can be weighed.
