= 2-Nitronaphthalene =

Names
- Preferred IUPAC name 2-Nitronaphthalene

Identifiers
CAS Number	581-89-5
3D model (JSmol)	Interactive image
Beilstein Reference	2046354
ChEBI	CHEBI:50637
ChEMBL	ChEMBL353064
ChemSpider	10914
ECHA InfoCard	100.008.614
EC Number	209-474-5
KEGG	C19474
PubChem CID	11392
RTECS number	QJ9760000
UNII	V5NB52B64Q
UN number	2538
CompTox Dashboard (EPA)	DTXSID2073198
- InChI: InChI=1S/C10H7NO2/c12-11(13)10-6-5-8-3-1-2-4-9(8)7-10/h1-7H Key: ZJYJZEAJZXVAMF-UHFFFAOYSA-N
- SMILES: C1=CC=C2C=C(C=CC2=C1)[N+](=O)[O-]

Properties
Chemical formula	C_{10}H_{7}NO_{2}
Molar mass	173.171 g·mol^{−1}
Appearance	colorless solid
Density	1,31 g·cm^{−3}
Melting point	79 °C (174 °F; 352 K)

Hazards
- GHS labelling
Pictograms	(GHS08: Health hazard) (GHS09: Environmental hazard)
Signal word	Danger
Hazard statements	H350, H411
Precautionary statements	P203, P273, P280, P318, P391, P405, P501
- Except where otherwise noted, data are given for materials in their standard state (at 25 °C [77 °F], 100 kPa). Infobox references

2-Nitronaphthalene is an organic compound with the formula C_{10}H_{7}NO_{2}. It is one of two isomers of nitronaphthalene, the other being 1-nitronaphthalene. 2-Nitronaphthalene is produced in very low yields upon nitration of naphthalene, but it can be more efficiently obtained via the diazotization of 2-aminonaphthalene.
