= Rugulosin =

Names
- IUPAC name 8,10,14,23,25,28-hexahydroxy-6,21-dimethyloctacyclo[14.11.1.02,11.02,15.04,9.013,17.017,26.019,24]octacosa-4(9),5,7,10,19(24),20,22,25-octaene-3,12,18,27-tetrone
- Other names NSC 160880; NSC 249990; Rugulosin A

Identifiers
| CAS Number | 21884-45-7; natural: 23537-16-8 |
| 3D model (JSmol) | Interactive image; natural: Interactive image |
| ChEBI | CHEBI:80712 |
| ChemSpider | 58827797 |
| KEGG | C16764 |
| PubChem CID | 62769 |
| UNII | 7020AB775D |
| CompTox Dashboard (EPA) | DTXSID40891838 |
- InChI: InChI=1S/C30H22O10/c1-7-3-9-13(11(31)5-7)21(33)17-25(37)20-23(35)15-16-24(36)19(29(15,17)27(9)39)26(38)18-22(34)14-10(28(40)30(16,18)20)4-8(2)6-12(14)32/h3-6,15-16,19-20,23-24,31-36H,1-2H3 Key: QFDPVUTXKUGISP-UHFFFAOYSA-N
- SMILES: CC1=CC2=C(C(=C1)O)C(=C3C(=O)C4C(C5C3(C2=O)C6C(C5C47C(=C(C8=C(C7=O)C=C(C=C8O)C)O)C6=O)O)O)O; natural: Cc1cc2c(c(c1)O)C(=O)C3=C([C@H]4[C@H]([C@H]5[C@]3(C2=O)[C@@H]6[C@H]([C@H]5[C@]47C(=O)c8cc(cc(c8C(=O)C7=C6O)O)C)O)O)O

Properties
| Chemical formula | C_{30}H_{22}O_{10} |
| Molar mass | 542.496 g·mol^{−1} |
- Except where otherwise noted, data are given for materials in their standard state (at 25 °C [77 °F], 100 kPa). Infobox references

Rugulosin is an anthraquinoid mycotoxin with the molecular formula C_{30}H_{22}O_{10} which is produced by Penicillium species. Rugulosin is hepatotoxic and is cancerogenic.
