= 1-Nitronaphthalene =

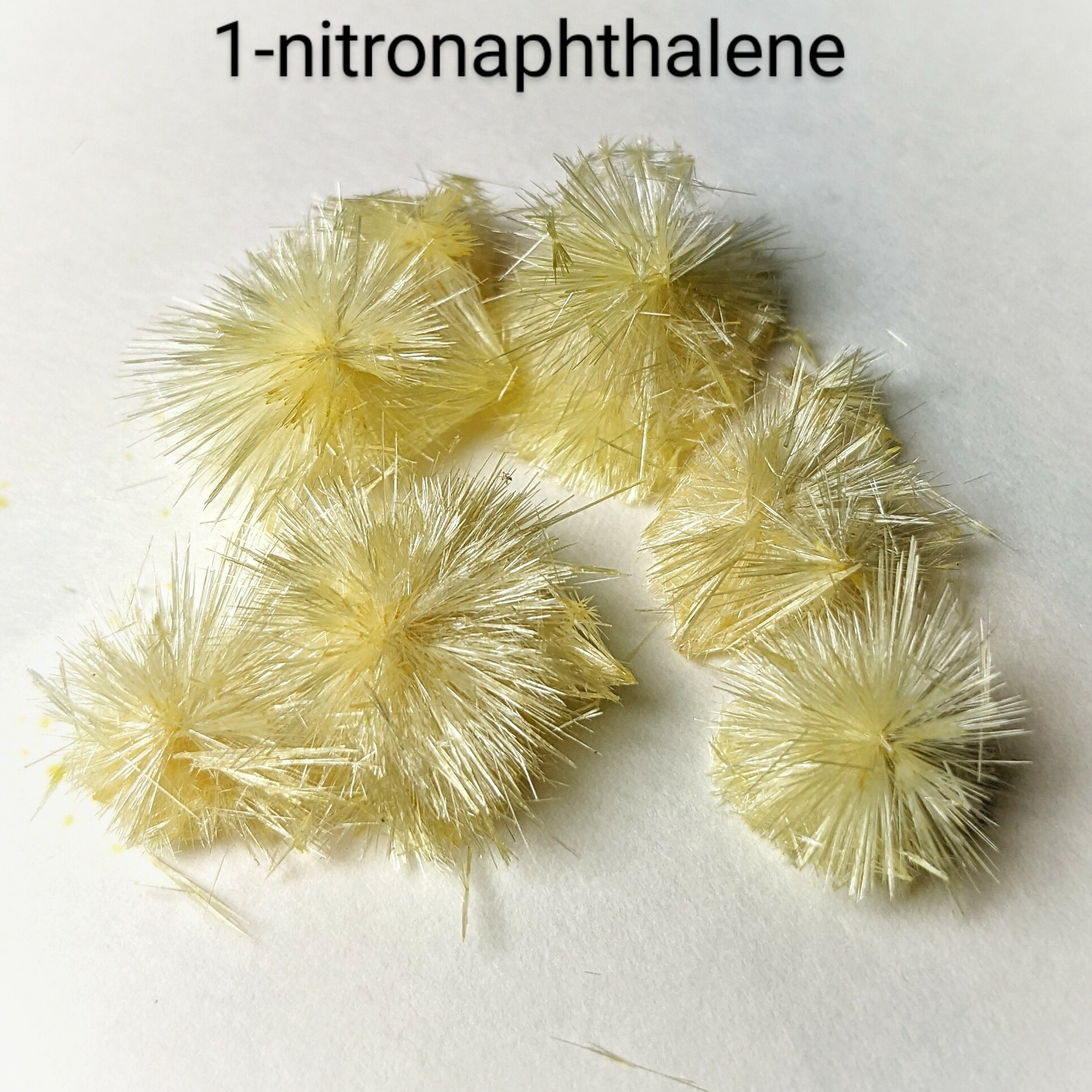

Names
- Preferred IUPAC name 1-Nitronaphthalene
- Other names α-Nitronaphthalene

Identifiers
CAS Number	86-57-7
3D model (JSmol)	Interactive image
Beilstein Reference	1867714
ChEBI	CHEBI:34104
ChEMBL	ChEMBL165373
ChemSpider	6588
ECHA InfoCard	100.001.531
EC Number	201-684-5
KEGG	C14040
PubChem CID	6849
UNII	A51NP1DL2T
UN number	2538
CompTox Dashboard (EPA)	DTXSID7020978
- InChI: InChI=1S/C10H7NO2/c12-11(13)10-7-3-5-8-4-1-2-6-9(8)10/h1-7H Key: RJKGJBPXVHTNJL-UHFFFAOYSA-N
- SMILES: C1=CC=C2C(=C1)C=CC=C2[N+](=O)[O-]

Properties
Chemical formula	C_{10}H_{7}NO_{2}
Molar mass	173.171 g·mol^{−1}
Appearance	pale yellow solid
Density	1.223 g/cm^{3}
Melting point	53–57 °C (127–135 °F; 326–330 K)
Boiling point	304 °C (579 °F; 577 K)
Solubility in water	releases toxic and flammable gas
Vapor pressure	0.00064 hPa

Hazards
- GHS labelling
Pictograms	(GHS02: Flammable) (GHS07: Exclamation mark) (GHS09: Environmental hazard)
Signal word	Warning
Hazard statements	H228, H302, H411
Precautionary statements	P210, P240, P241, P264, P270, P273, P280, P301+P312+P330, P370+P378, P391, P501
NFPA 704 (fire diamond)	4 2 2 W
Flash point	164 °C (327 °F; 437 K) (closed cup)
Autoignition temperature	450 °C (842 °F; 723 K)
- Lethal dose or concentration (LD, LC)
LD_{50} (median dose)	350 mg/kg (oral, rat)
LC_{50} (median concentration)	>0.04 mg/L (inhalation, rat); 2.0–4.0 mg/L (fathead minnow, 96h)
- Except where otherwise noted, data are given for materials in their standard state (at 25 °C [77 °F], 100 kPa). Infobox references

1-Nitronaphthalene is an organic compound with the formula C_{10}H_{7}NO_{2}. It is one of two isomers of nitronaphthalene. A pale yellow, sublimable solid, 1-nitronaphthalene is the main product of the direct nitration of naphthalene. It is an intermediate in the production of naphthylamine, a precursor to dyes. The conversion to the amine is effected by hydrogenation.
