= Penicillic acid =

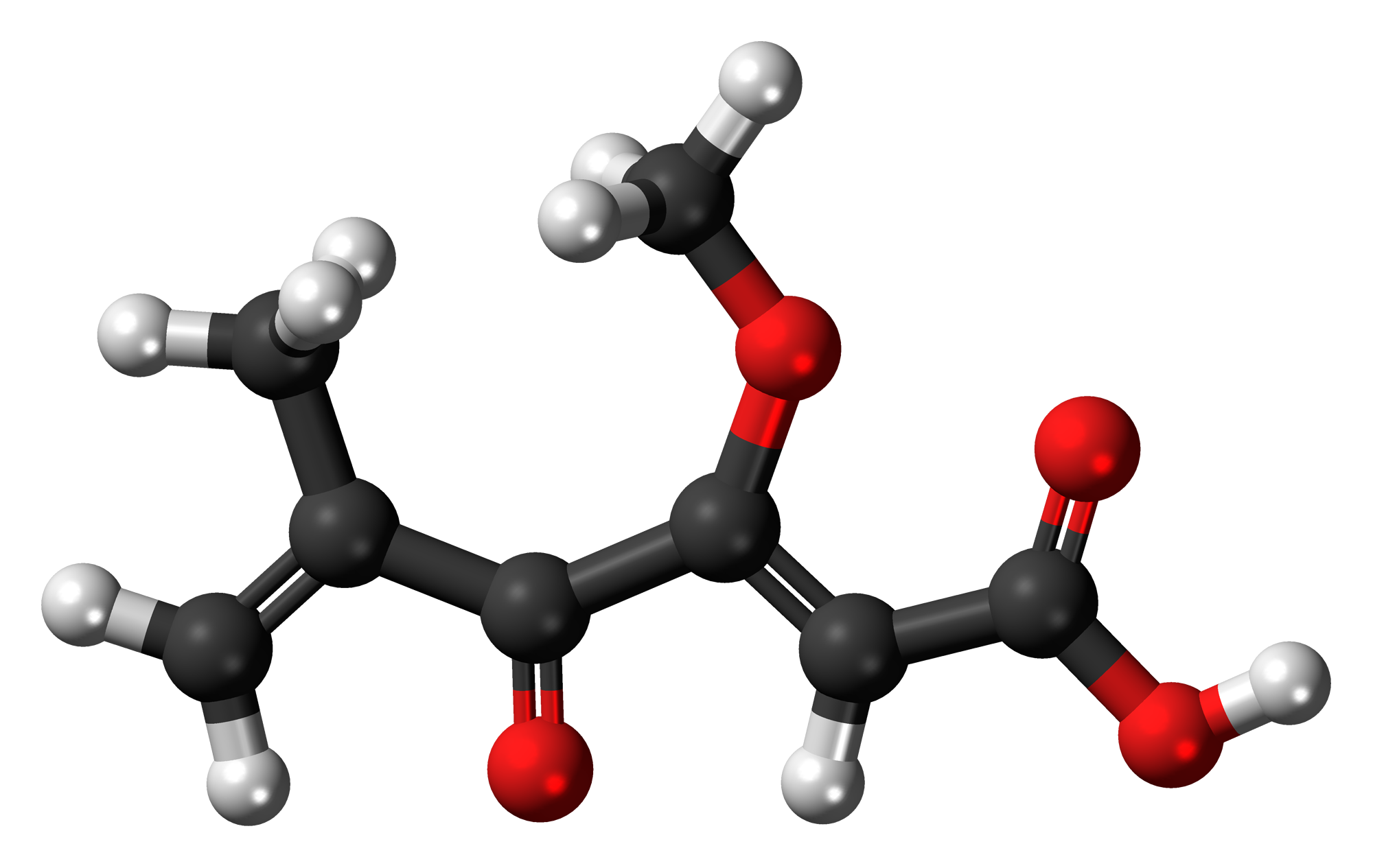

Names
- IUPAC name 5-Hydroxy-5-isopropenyl-4-methoxy-furan-2-one

Identifiers
| CAS Number | 90-65-3 |
| 3D model (JSmol) | Interactive image |
| ChemSpider | 1064791 |
| ECHA InfoCard | 100.001.826 |
| EC Number | 202-008-1 |
| KEGG | C19495 |
| PubChem CID | 1268111 |
| UNII | ONL14K3AFD |
- InChI: InChI=1S/C8H10O4/c1-5(2)8(11)6(12-3)4-7(9)10/h4H,1H2,2-3H3,(H,9,10)/b6-4- Key: VOUGEZYPVGAPBB-XQRVVYSFSA-N
- SMILES: CC(=C)C1(C=CC(=O)O1)O

Properties
| Chemical formula | C_{8}H_{10}O_{4} |
| Molar mass | 170.164 g·mol^{−1} |
- Except where otherwise noted, data are given for materials in their standard state (at 25 °C [77 °F], 100 kPa). verify (what is ?) Infobox references

Penicillic acid is a mycotoxin that is produced by Aspergillus flavus, Aspergillus ostianus and Penicillium roqueforti mold. It is not a product of acid degradation of penicillin. Biosynthesis of the compound has been stablished.

Its first practical synthesis was reported in 1947 by Ralph Raphael, who had worked on penicillin during World War II.
