= Vioxanthin =

Names
- IUPAC name (3R)-8-[(3R)-9,10-Dihydroxy-7-methoxy-3-methyl-1-oxo-3,4-dihydrobenzo[g]isochromen-8-yl]-9,10-dihydroxy-7-methoxy-3-methyl-3,4-dihydrobenzo[g]isochromen-1-one

Identifiers
CAS Number	15447-05-9
3D model (JSmol)	Interactive image
ChEMBL	ChEMBL1834754
ChemSpider	106396
PubChem CID	119072
UNII	9C67W47A7M
CompTox Dashboard (EPA)	DTXSID001017880
- InChI: InChI=1S/C30H26O10/c1-11-5-13-7-15-9-17(37-3)23(27(33)19(15)25(31)21(13)29(35)39-11)24-18(38-4)10-16-8-14-6-12(2)40-30(36)22(14)26(32)20(16)28(24)34/h7-12,31-34H,5-6H2,1-4H3/t11-,12-/m1/s1 Key: CJKYODJTBJDEJI-VXGBXAGGSA-N
- SMILES: C[C@@H]1CC2=C(C(=C3C(=C2)C=C(C(=C3O)C4=C(C5=C(C6=C(C[C@H](OC6=O)C)C=C5C=C4OC)O)O)OC)O)C(=O)O1

Properties
Chemical formula	C_{30}H_{26}O_{10}
Molar mass	546.528 g·mol^{−1}
Appearance	Brownish-yellow solid
- Except where otherwise noted, data are given for materials in their standard state (at 25 °C [77 °F], 100 kPa). Infobox references

Vioxanthin is a mycotoxin that was first isolated from the pathogenic fungus Trichophyton violaceum and characterized in 1966. It is a pigment with a brownish-yellow color. It has since been found to be a constituent of a variety of other fungi including those in the genus Penicillium and Aspergillus. The detection of vioxanthin in food products has been used as evidence of contamination with these fungi.

A laboratory synthesis of vioxanthin has been reported.
