= Aspergillus ibericus =

Scientific classification
- Kingdom: Fungi
- Division: Ascomycota
- Class: Eurotiomycetes
- Order: Eurotiales
- Family: Aspergillaceae
- Genus: Aspergillus
- Species: A. ibericus

Binomial name
- Aspergillus ibericus Serra, Cabañes & Perrone (2006)

Species of fungus

Aspergillus ibericus is a species of black mould fungus in the family Aspergillaceae. It was first identified and described in 2006 after being isolated from vineyard soils and grapes in Spain and Portugal. Named after the Iberian Peninsula where it was discovered, this distinctive fungus grows as a powdery black mould with small, spherical spores and is known for not producing harmful toxins like ochratoxin A, making it safer than related species in food contexts. While primarily found in Mediterranean wine-growing regions, particularly in the Douro region of Portugal and La Rioja in Spain, it has also been detected on stored olives and has shown promising applications in biotechnology, particularly in breaking down agricultural waste products and producing valuable enzymes for industrial use.

== Taxonomy ==
Aspergillus ibericus is a member of the "black Aspergilli" (section Nigri) first described in 2006. It was identified by a consortium of Portuguese, Italian, and British mycologists led by Rita Serra and Giusy Mulè, who isolated it from vineyard soil and grapes in the Iberian Peninsula. The species epithet ibericus reflects its origin in Spain and Portugal. Using morphological characters and DNA sequence data, A. ibericus was distinguished from other black aspergilli such as A. niger and A. tubingensis. It does not produce ochratoxin A (a harmful mycotoxin), which was an important finding given the concern about black molds on grapes.

The genome of A. ibericus was sequenced and published in 2014 as part of the Aspergillus whole-genome sequencing project – a project dedicated to performing whole-genome sequencing of all members of the genus Aspergillus. The genome assembly size was 33.44 Mbp.

== Description ==
In culture, A. ibericus grows as a black, powdery mold. It produces velvety black colonies with conidial heads that are radiate and somewhat smaller than those of A. niger. Microscopic features include smooth-walled, brown conidiophores and globose (roughly spherical) conidia (asexual spores) around 4–5 μm in diameter. The conidia are roughened (finely warty) and jet-black in mass. A. ibericus closely resembles A. hondensis (another black Aspergillus) in morphology, but can be separated by DNA sequences and subtle growth tests. Physiologically, A. libericus was noted to grow well at 37 °C and pH of about 6, and to produce industrially relevant enzymes such as fructofuranosidase and lipases. Chemical analysis showed it does not produce ochratoxins or fumonisins, making it safer in food contexts than some related species.

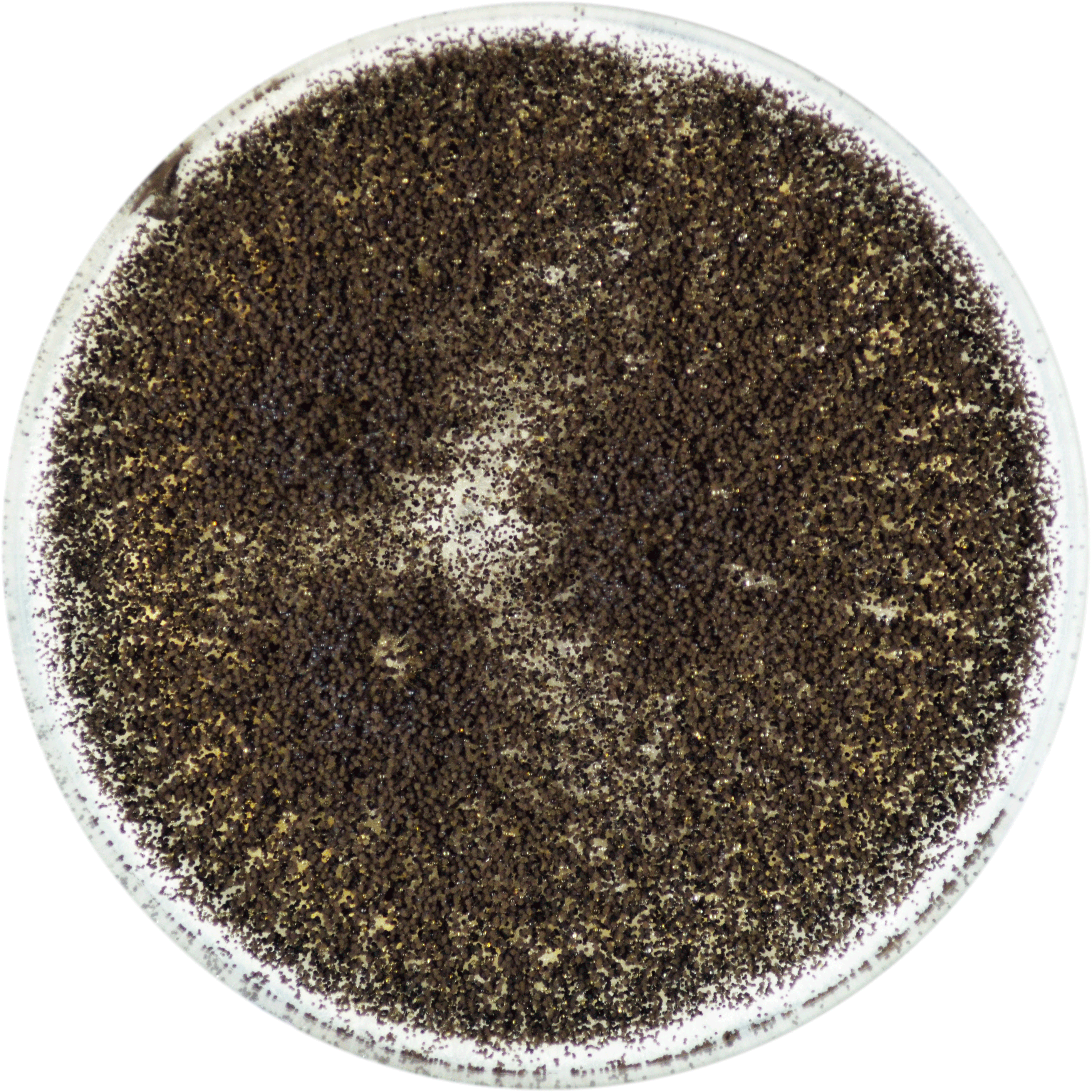
Aspergillus ibericus growing on Czapek yeast extract agar (CYA)

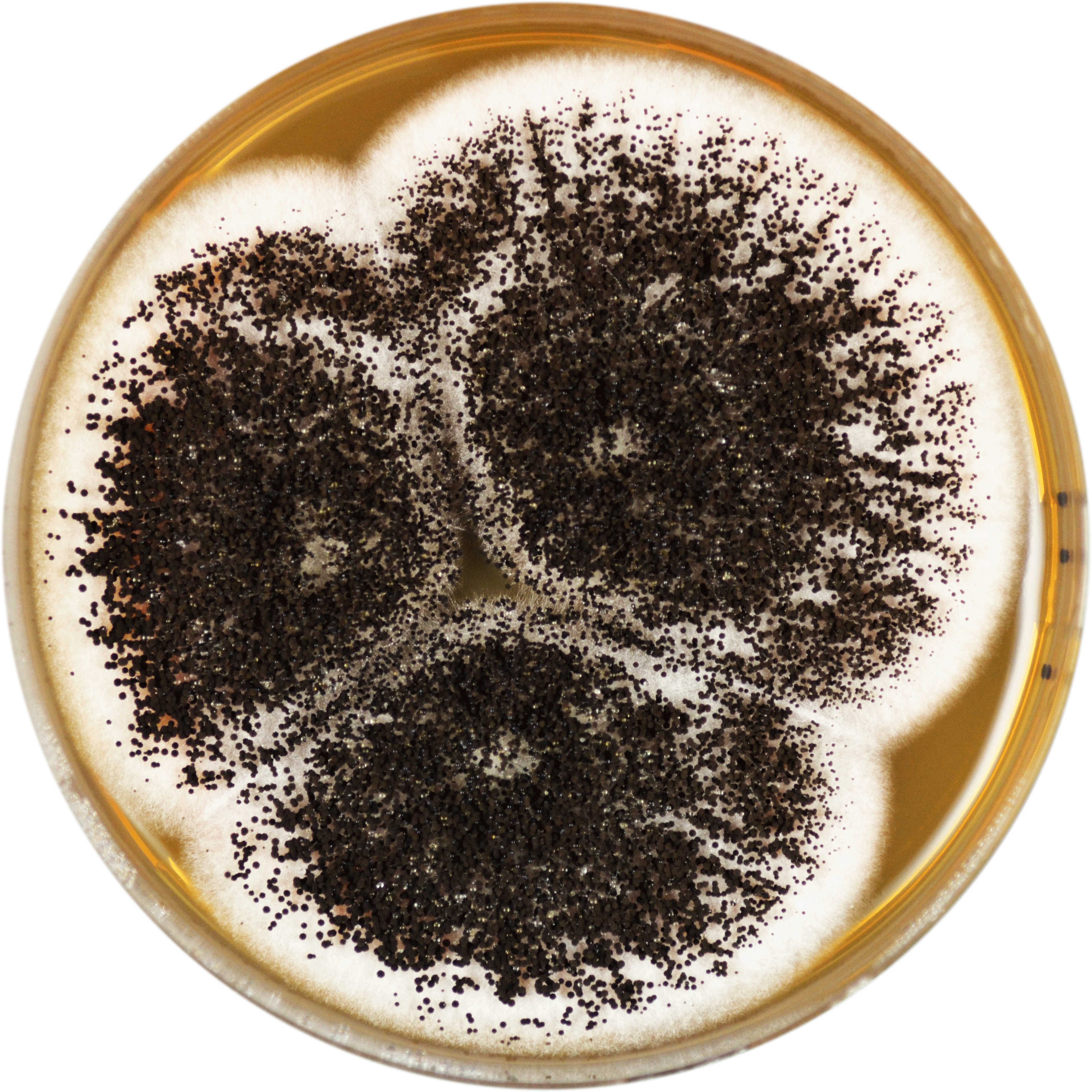
Aspergillus ibericus growing on Malt Extract Agar Oxoid® (MEAOX) plate

== Habitat and distribution ==
Aspergillus ibericus appears to be native to the Iberian Peninsula, particularly associated with wine grapes and vineyard soils. It was first isolated from grape berries and must in Portugal and Spain. Multiple strains were obtained from Portuguese vineyards (Douro region) and Spanish vineyards (La Rioja), indicating it may be part of the natural fungal flora on grapevines in Mediterranean climates. Since its description, A. ibericus has also been detected in other Mediterranean environments – for example, on stored olives and olive pomace in Spain. It seems adapted to warm, sugar-rich substrates like drying fruits. The species has been applied experimentally in biotechnology: strains of A. ibericus have been used in solid-state fermentation of olive mill waste and fruit peels to produce enzymes. These studies suggest A. ibericus can be readily cultivated and has potential industrial uses (e.g. lipase production for food processing). As for distribution, beyond Iberia there are isolated reports from Italy and North Africa (likely via grape commerce or similar niches), but it remains primarily known from southwestern Europe. Its presence on grapes raises questions about whether it influences wine fermentation; however, because it does not produce toxins, it is not considered a threat to wine safety. Instead, A. ibericus may even be beneficial – for instance, it was found capable of breaking down olive mill wastewater and yielding valuable compounds.
