= Aspergillus pseudoelegans =

Scientific classification
- Kingdom: Fungi
- Division: Ascomycota
- Class: Eurotiomycetes
- Order: Eurotiales
- Family: Aspergillaceae
- Genus: Aspergillus
- Species: A. pseudoelegans

Binomial name
- Aspergillus pseudoelegans Frisvad & Samson (2004)

Species of fungus

Aspergillus pseudoelegans is a species of fungus in the genus Aspergillus. It is from the Circumdati section. The species was first described in 2004. It has been reported to produce asteltoxins and ochratoxin A.

== Growth and morphology ==
A. pseudoelegans has been cultivated on both Czapek yeast extract agar (CYA) plates and Malt Extract Agar Oxoid® (MEAOX) plates. The growth morphology of the colonies can be seen in the pictures below.

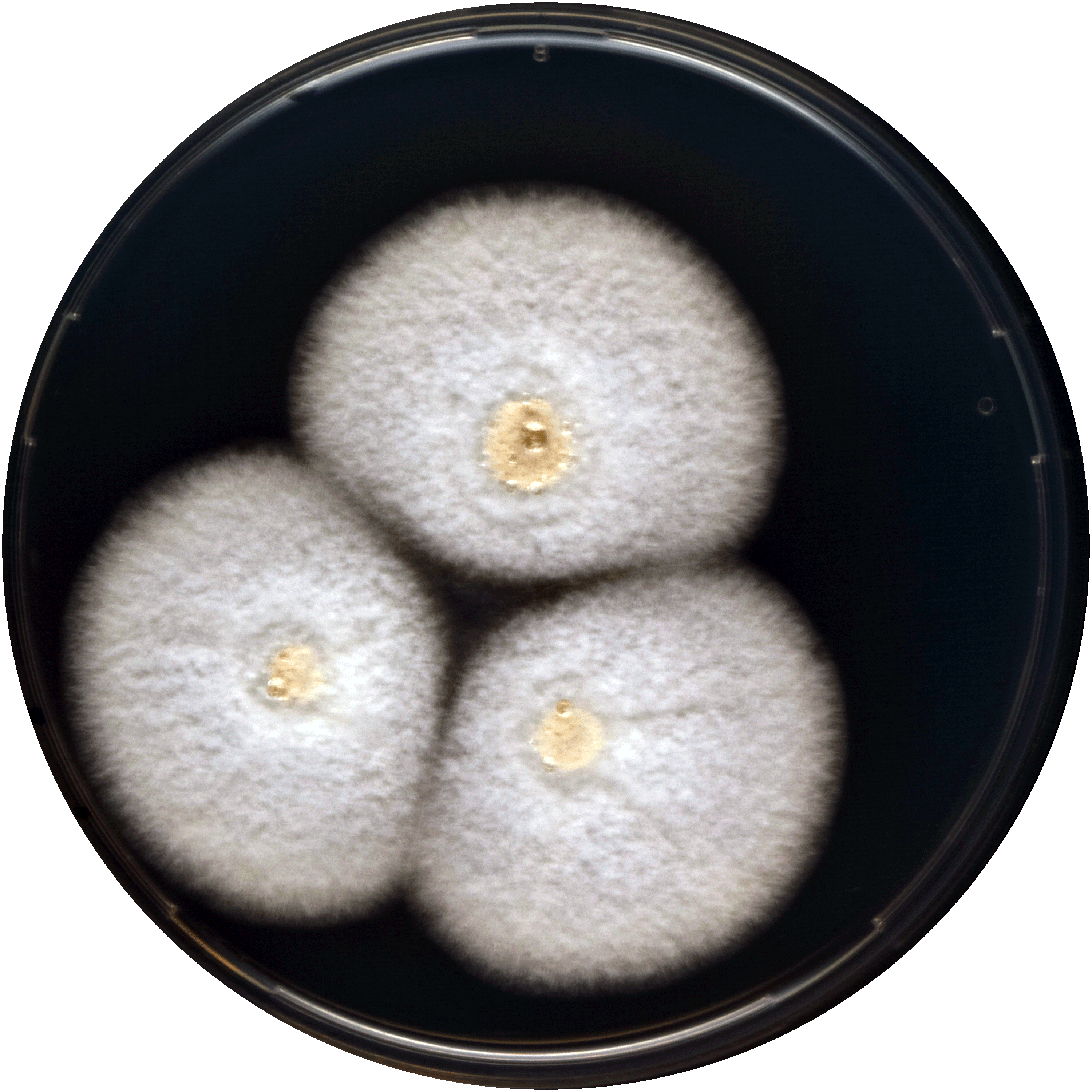
Aspergillus pseudoelegans growing on CYA plate

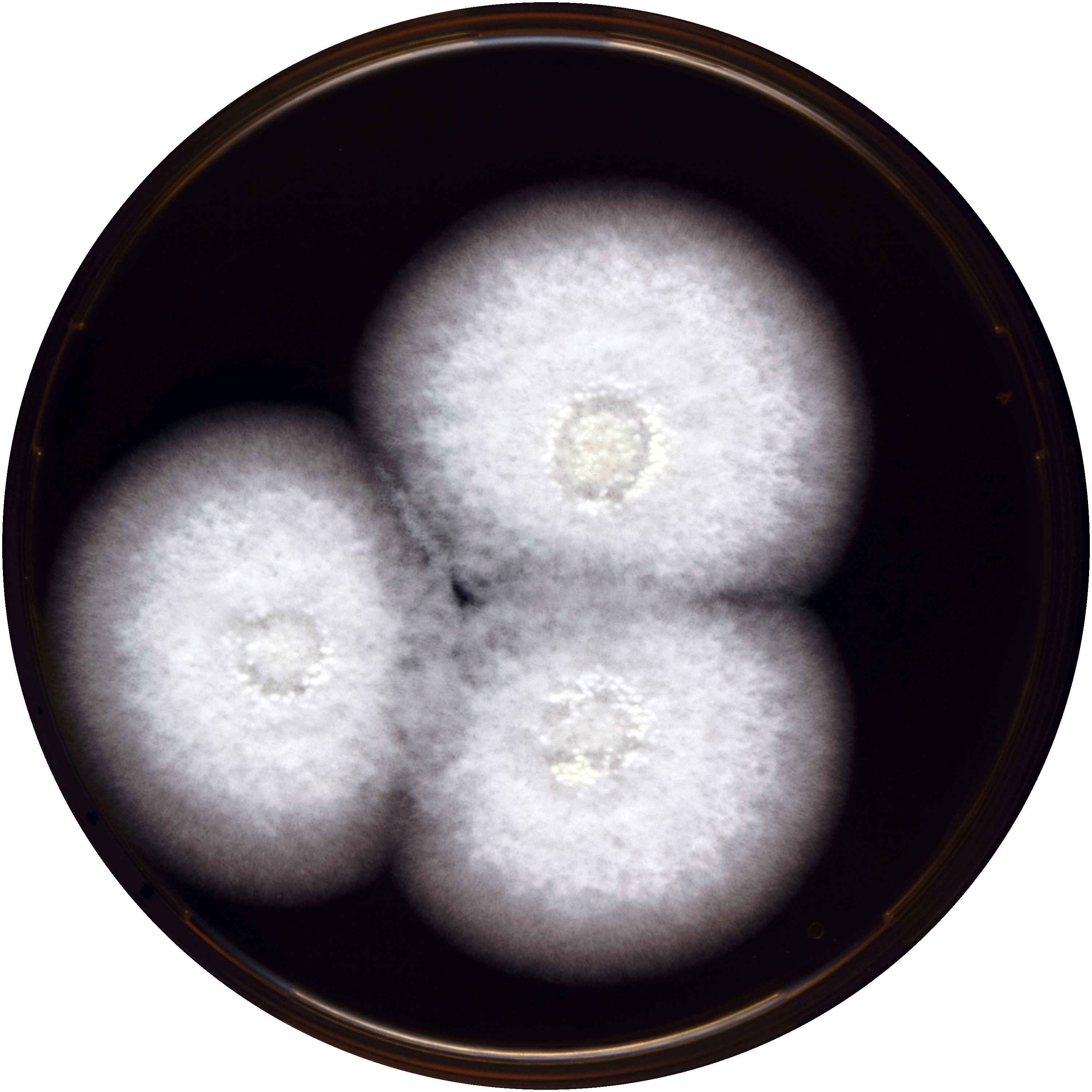
Aspergillus pseudoelegans growing on MEAOX plate
