= Penicillium nordicum =

Scientific classification
- Kingdom: Fungi
- Division: Ascomycota
- Class: Eurotiomycetes
- Order: Eurotiales
- Family: Aspergillaceae
- Genus: Penicillium
- Species: P. nordicum

Binomial name
- Penicillium nordicum Dragoni & Cantoni ex C. Ramírez 1985

Species of fungus

Penicillium nordicum is an anamorph species of fungus in the genus Penicillium which produces ochratoxin A. Penicillium nordicum contaminates protein rich foods and foods with high NaCl-konzentration. It is mostly found on dry-cured meat products and cheese products

== Spoilage in the food industry ==
P. nordicum is one of several species (specific of the genus Aspergillus and Penicillium) that produces Ochratoxin A. Ochratoxin A is a mycotoxin that is a known contaminant of several food sources since it is stable in acidic environments, is difficult to ensure adequate sterilization from it through cooking, and is made by species that persist in high salt and low-temperature. environments. P. nordicum is commonly found on dried meats, like salami and cured ham, as well as other food products like cheese rinds. All of these foods are highly salted and protein-rich. Besides being isolated from the surface of these foods, it has also been isolated from the air of such storage facilities in various European factories. For the contaminated meat products, P. nordicum was isolated from the salt used to season the products in several cases, indicating a similarity in raw material contamination. However, the overlapping morphological profile of P. nordicum and P. nalgiovense can make initial identification of a P. nordicum contamination difficult for the naked eye.

== Ecological niche of P. nordicum ==
P. nordicum is a psychrophilic fungus that has been isolated from Arctic environments, specifically from Arctic glaciers, seawater, and sea ice. The Arctic niche is characterized by low temperature, water movement, and high salt content which is rarer for fungal abundance and subsequent isolation. Several Penicillium species have been isolated from this niche and the species noted also are not known to grow in temperate, for example, soil, environments. There is a high degree of similarity between the Penicillium species that are found in food and the Arctic environment. Given the high salinity of these environments, one proposed mechanism of common contamination is through the sea salt used to season dried meats. Since it is known that P. nordicum can successfully grow in low-temperature environments as well, the storage conditions for dried meat curing overlap with the fungal niche.

== Biocontrol of P. nordicum ==
Fungal contamination is a large problem in the food industry as it can render massive quantities of food inedible. Ochratoxin A is produced by P. nordicum and can lead to renal failure or tumor formation by inhibiting protein synthesis, decreasing cellular energy production, resulting in genotoxic effects, inducing oxidative stress, or inciting apoptosis. One potential avenue to prevent Ochratoxin A consumption via eliminating P. nordicum is through biotic control and the use of protective cultures. Concurrent inoculation of two species before ripening, Debaryomyces hansenii and Staphylococcus xylosus, resulted in decreased Ochratoxin A production, potentially related to the repression of genes in the OTA biosynthesis pathway. In addition, certain lactic acid bacteria have also demonstrated an ability to decrease OTA production in P. nordicum, which is consequently beneficial as several species have probiotic properties. One proposed mechanism for this interaction is that the organic acids produced by LABs enter the microbe of interest and disrupt metabolic activity, potentially by altering pH.
