= Aspergillus affinis =

Scientific classification
- Kingdom: Fungi
- Division: Ascomycota
- Class: Eurotiomycetes
- Order: Eurotiales
- Family: Aspergillaceae
- Genus: Aspergillus
- Species: A. affinis

Binomial name
- Aspergillus affinis Davolos, Persiani, Pietrangeli & Maggi (2011)

Species of fungus

Aspergillus affinis is a species of fungus in the genus Aspergillus. It is from the Circumdati section. The species was first described in 2011. It has been reported to produce ochratoxin A and penicillic acid.

== Growth on agar plates ==
Apsergillus affinis has been cultivated on both Czapek yeast extract agar (CYA) plates and Malt Extract Agar Oxoid® (MEAOX) plates. The growth morphology of the colonies can be seen in the pictures below.

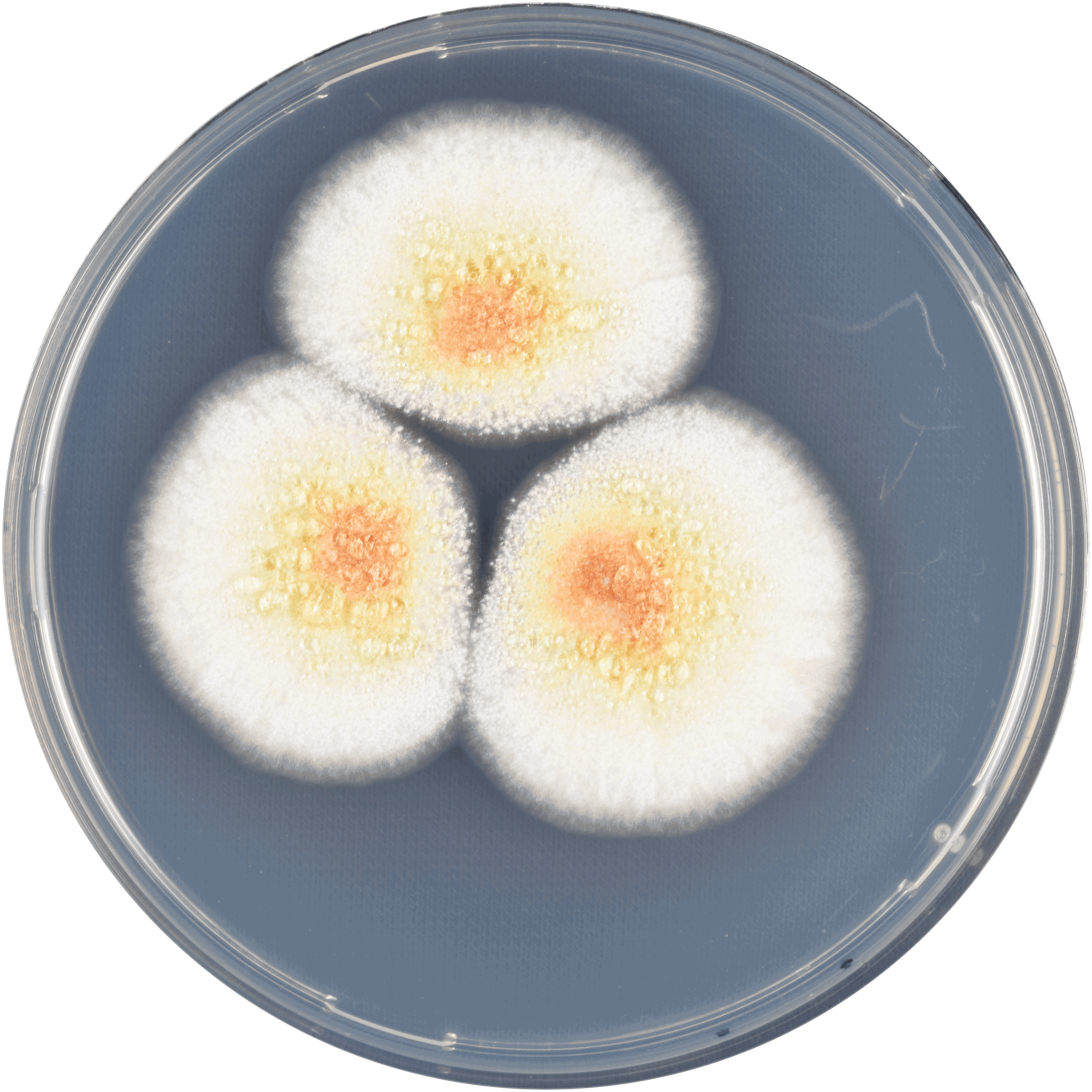
Aspergillus affinis growing on CYA plate

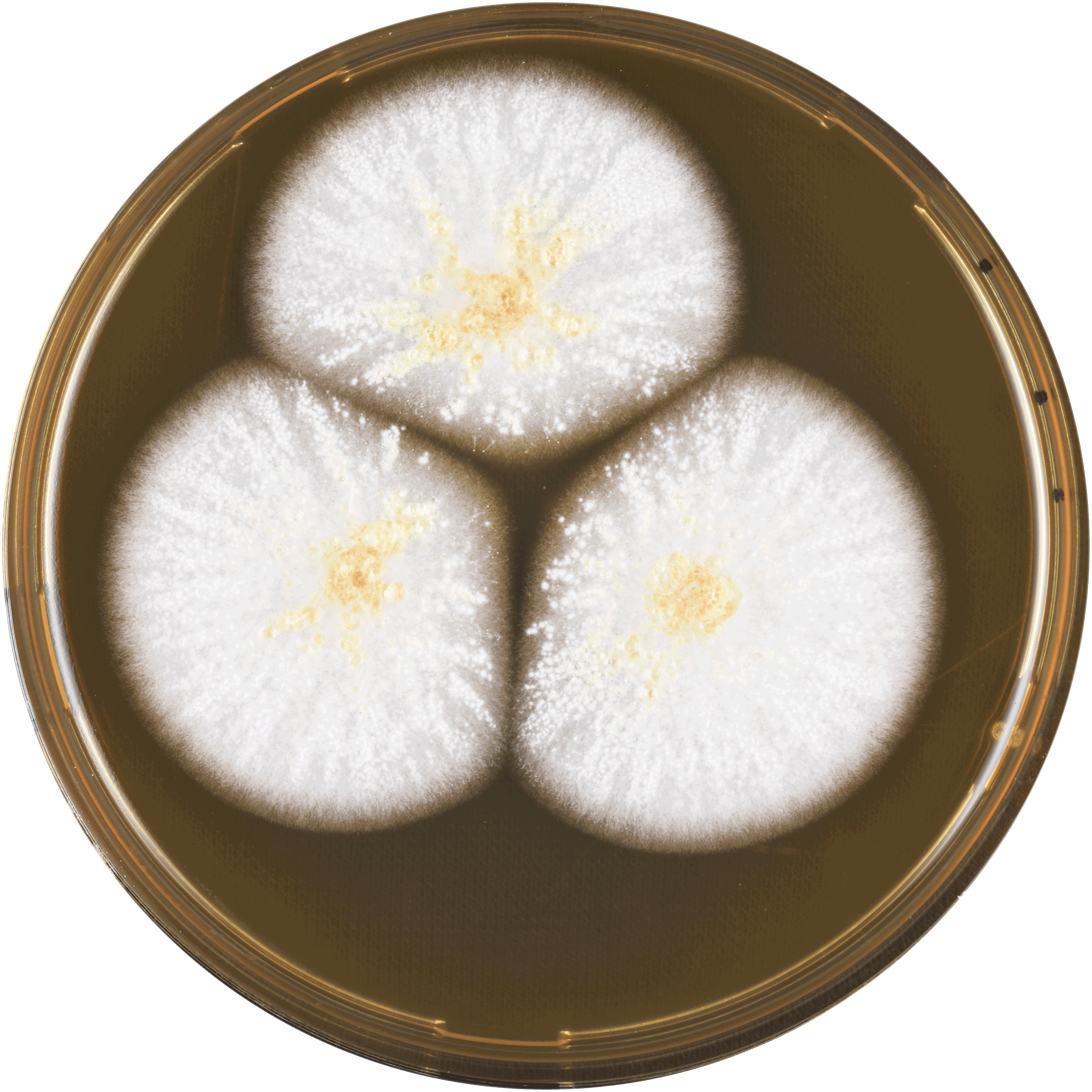
Aspergillus affinis growing on MEAOX plate
