= Aspergillus pulvericola =

Scientific classification
- Domain: Eukaryota
- Kingdom: Fungi
- Division: Ascomycota
- Class: Eurotiomycetes
- Order: Eurotiales
- Family: Aspergillaceae
- Genus: Aspergillus
- Species: A. pulvericola

Binomial name
- Aspergillus pulvericola Frisvad & Samson (2004)

Type strain
- CMV-2014a, CBS 137327, CBS H-21793, DTO 267-C6

Species of fungus

Aspergillus pulvericola is a species of fungus in the genus Aspergillus. It is from the Circumdati section. The species was first described in 2004. A. pulvericola produces ochratoxin A.

== Growth and morphology ==
A. pulvericola has been cultivated on both Czapek yeast extract agar (CYA) plates and Malt Extract Agar Oxoid® (MEAOX) plates. The growth morphology of the colonies can be seen in the pictures below.

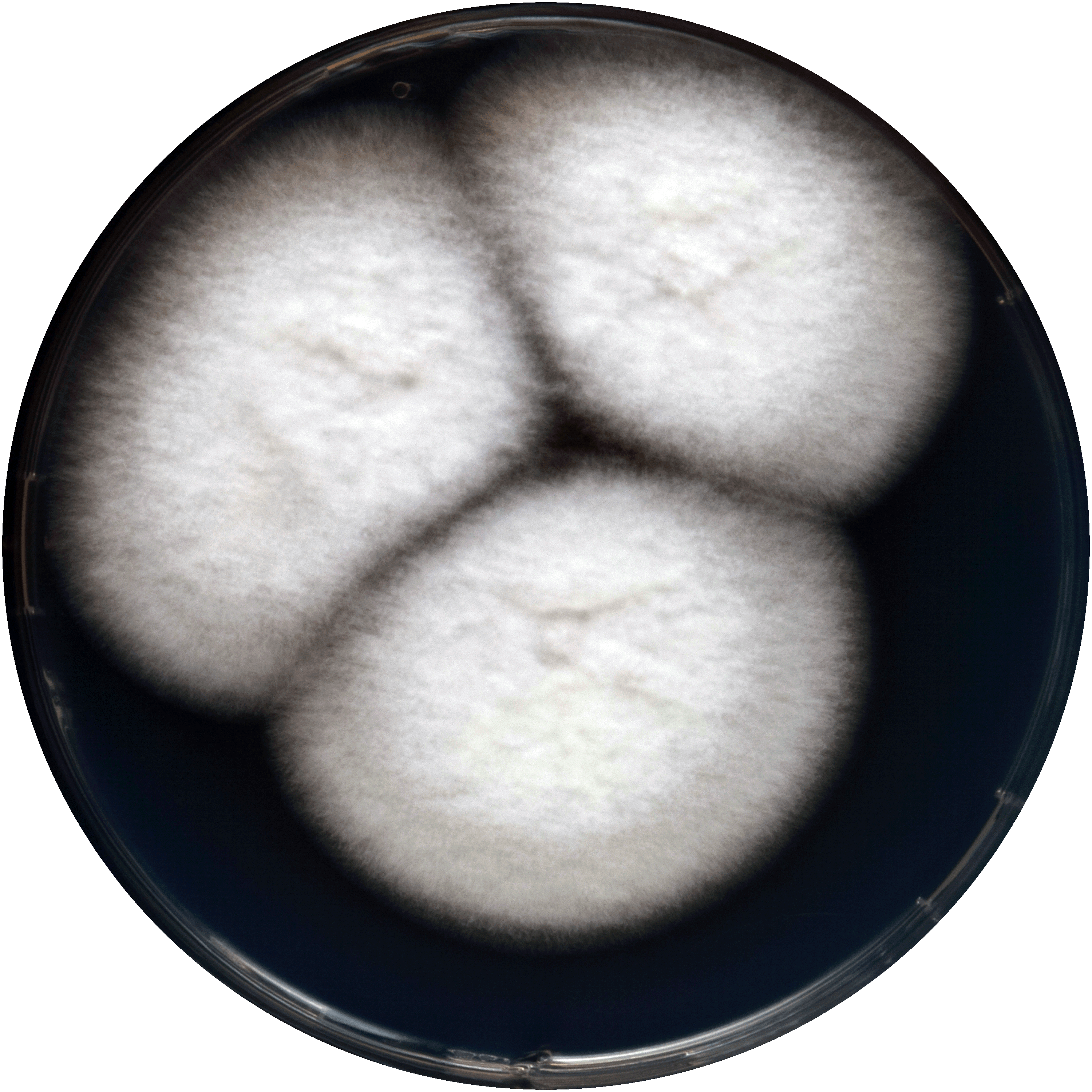
Aspergillus pulvericola growing on CYA plate

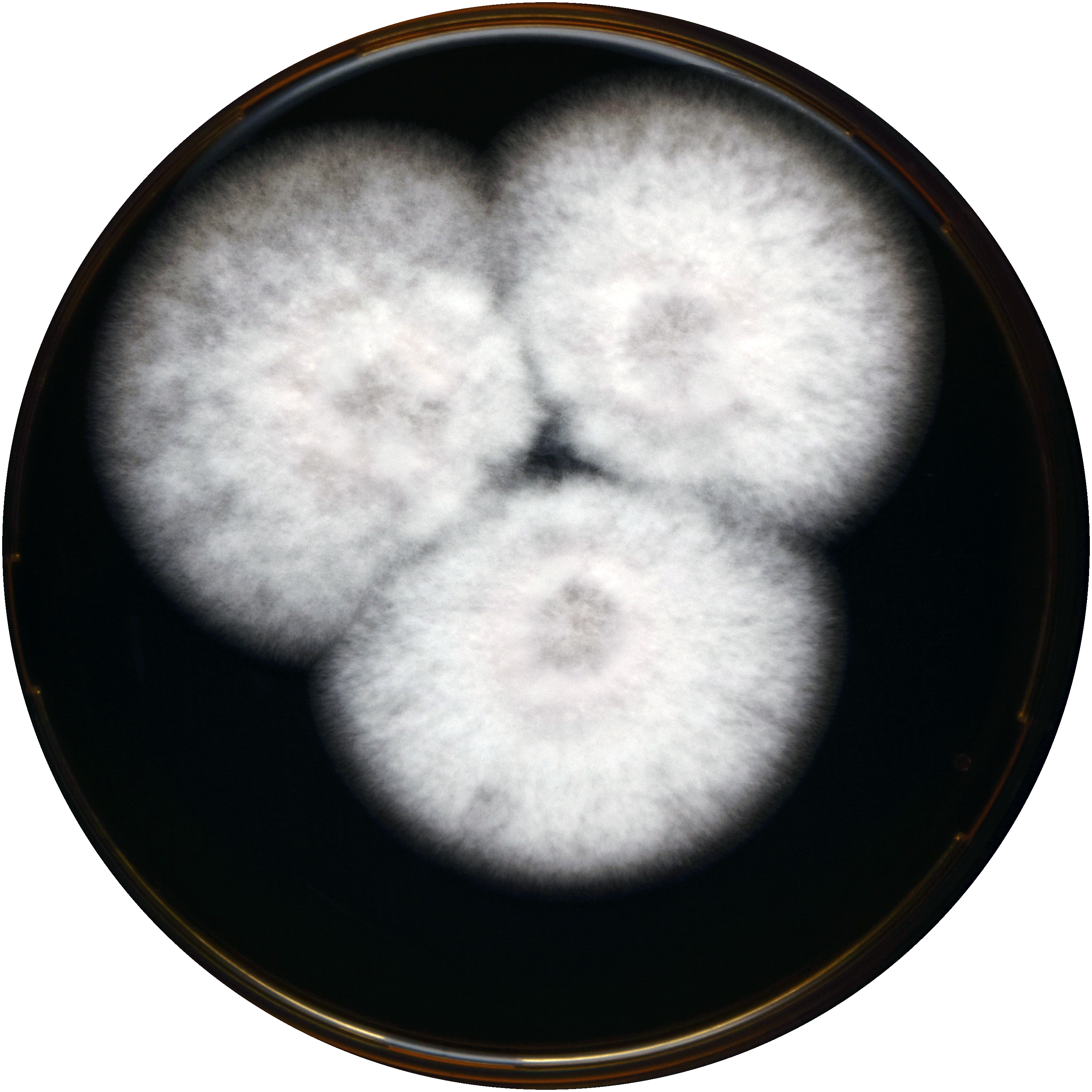
Aspergillus pulvericola growing on MEAOX plate
