= Aspergillus albertensis =

Scientific classification
- Kingdom: Fungi
- Division: Ascomycota
- Class: Eurotiomycetes
- Order: Eurotiales
- Family: Aspergillaceae
- Genus: Aspergillus
- Species: A. albertensis

Binomial name
- Aspergillus albertensis J.P. Tewari (1985)

Species of fungus

Aspergillus albertensis is a species of fungus in the genus Aspergillus. It is from the Flavi section. The species was first described in 1985. It was isolated from a human ear in Canada. A. albertensis has been shown to produce ochratoxin A and B. It forms yellow spores.

== Growth and morphology ==
A. albertensis has been cultivated on both Czapek yeast extract agar (CYA) plates and Malt Extract Agar Oxoid® (MEAOX) plates. The growth morphology of the colonies can be seen in the pictures below.

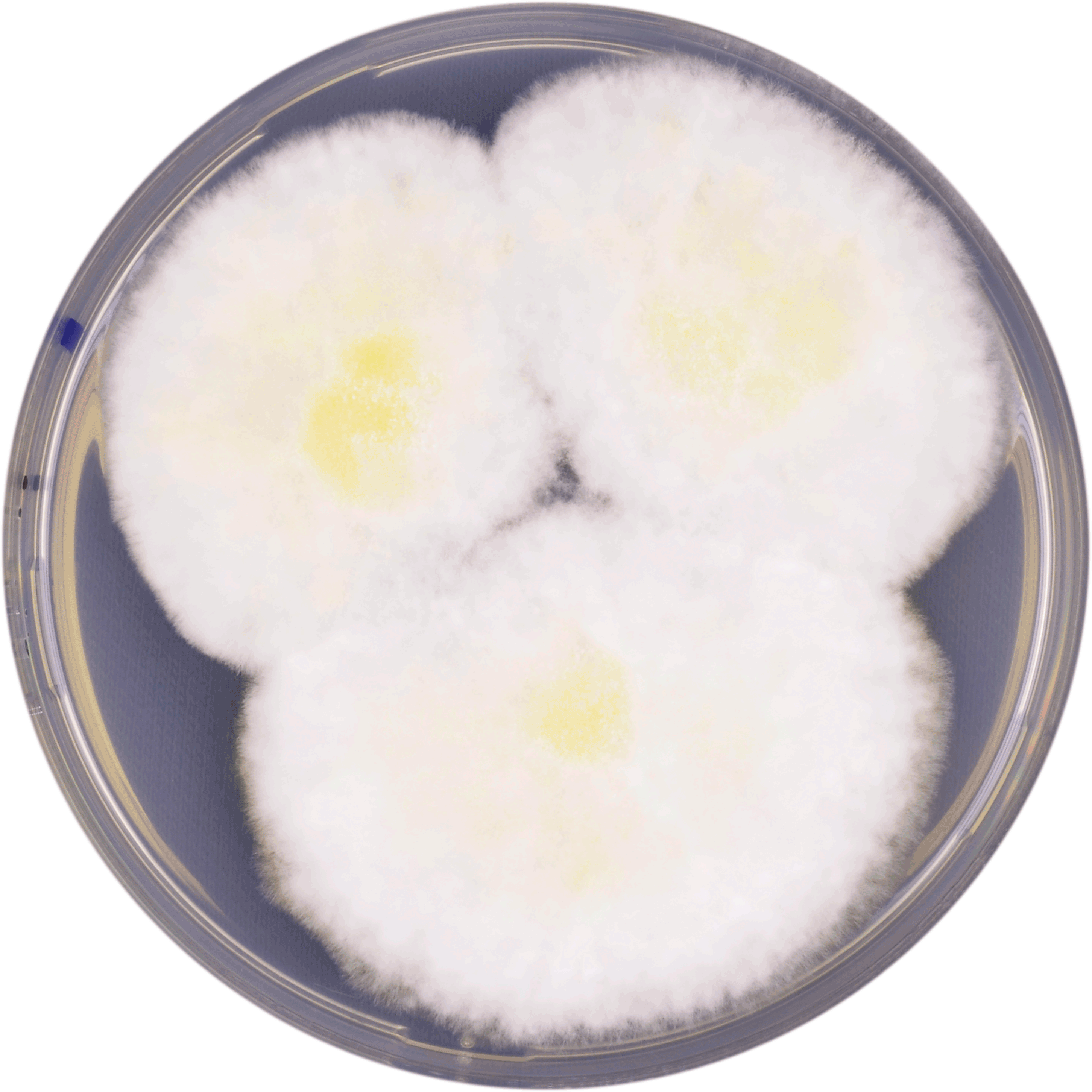
Aspergillus albertensis growing on CYA plate

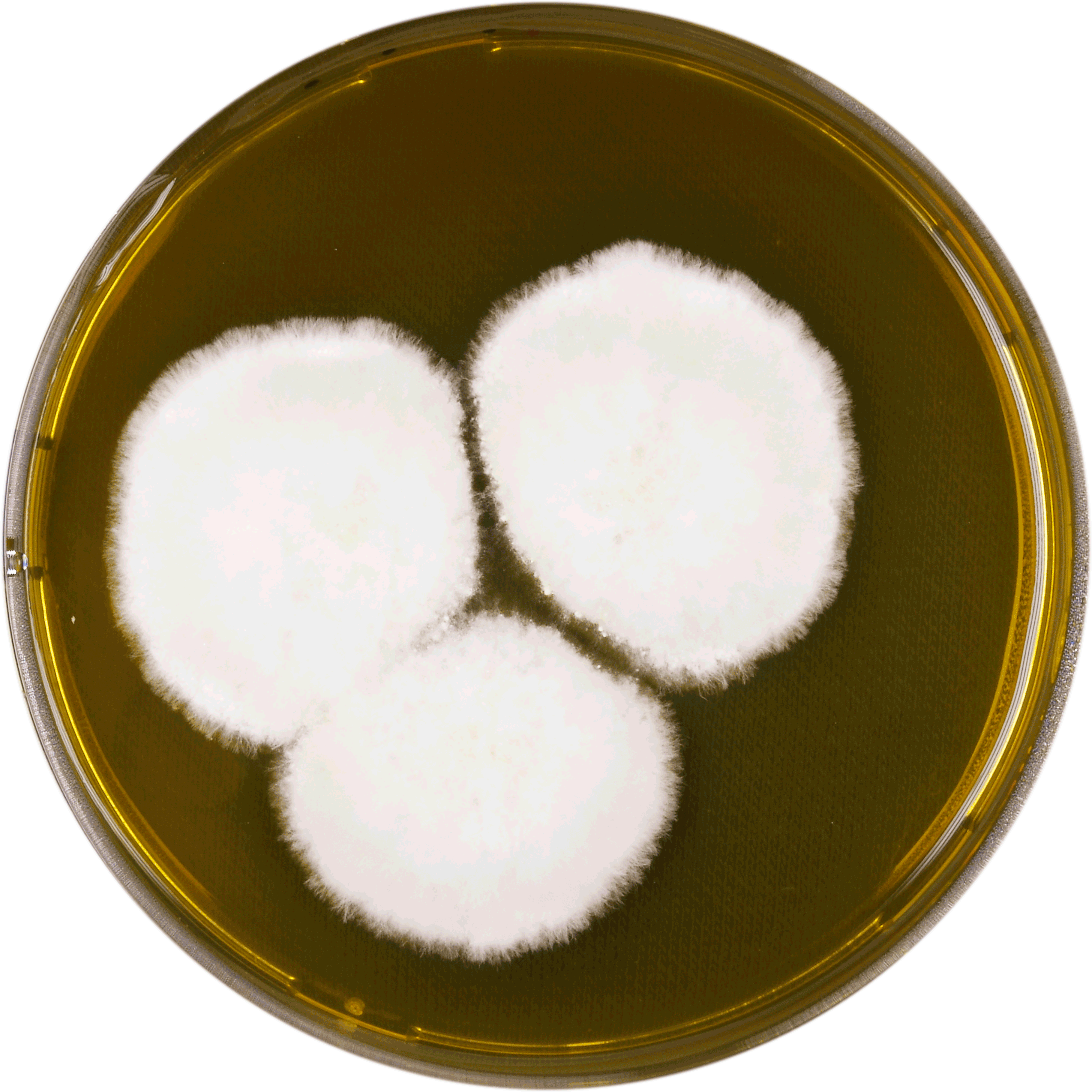
Aspergillus albertensis growing on MEAOX plate
