= Aspergillus persii =

Scientific classification
- Kingdom: Fungi
- Division: Ascomycota
- Class: Eurotiomycetes
- Order: Eurotiales
- Family: Aspergillaceae
- Genus: Aspergillus
- Species: A. persii

Binomial name
- Aspergillus persii A.M. Corte & Zotti 2002

Type strain
- CBS 112795, IBT 22660, MUCL 41970

Species of fungus

Aspergillus persii is a species of fungus in the genus Aspergillus which can cause onychomycosis. and otomycosis

It is from the Circumdati section. Aspergillus persii produces xanthomegnin and ochratoxin A.

== Growth and morphology ==
A. persii has been cultivated on both Czapek yeast extract agar (CYA) plates and Malt Extract Agar Oxoid® (MEAOX) plates. The growth morphology of the colonies can be seen in the pictures below.

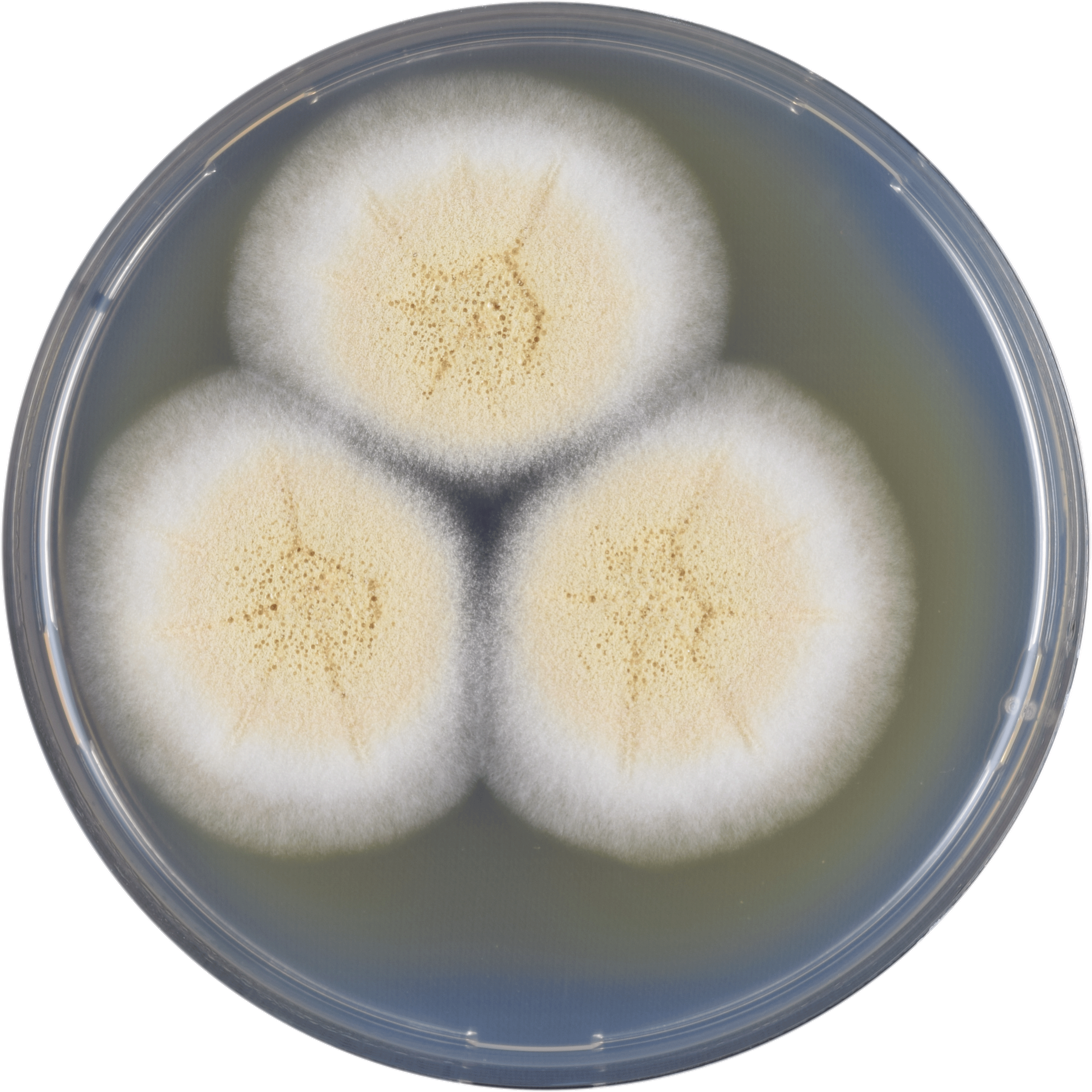
Aspergillus persii growing on CYA plate

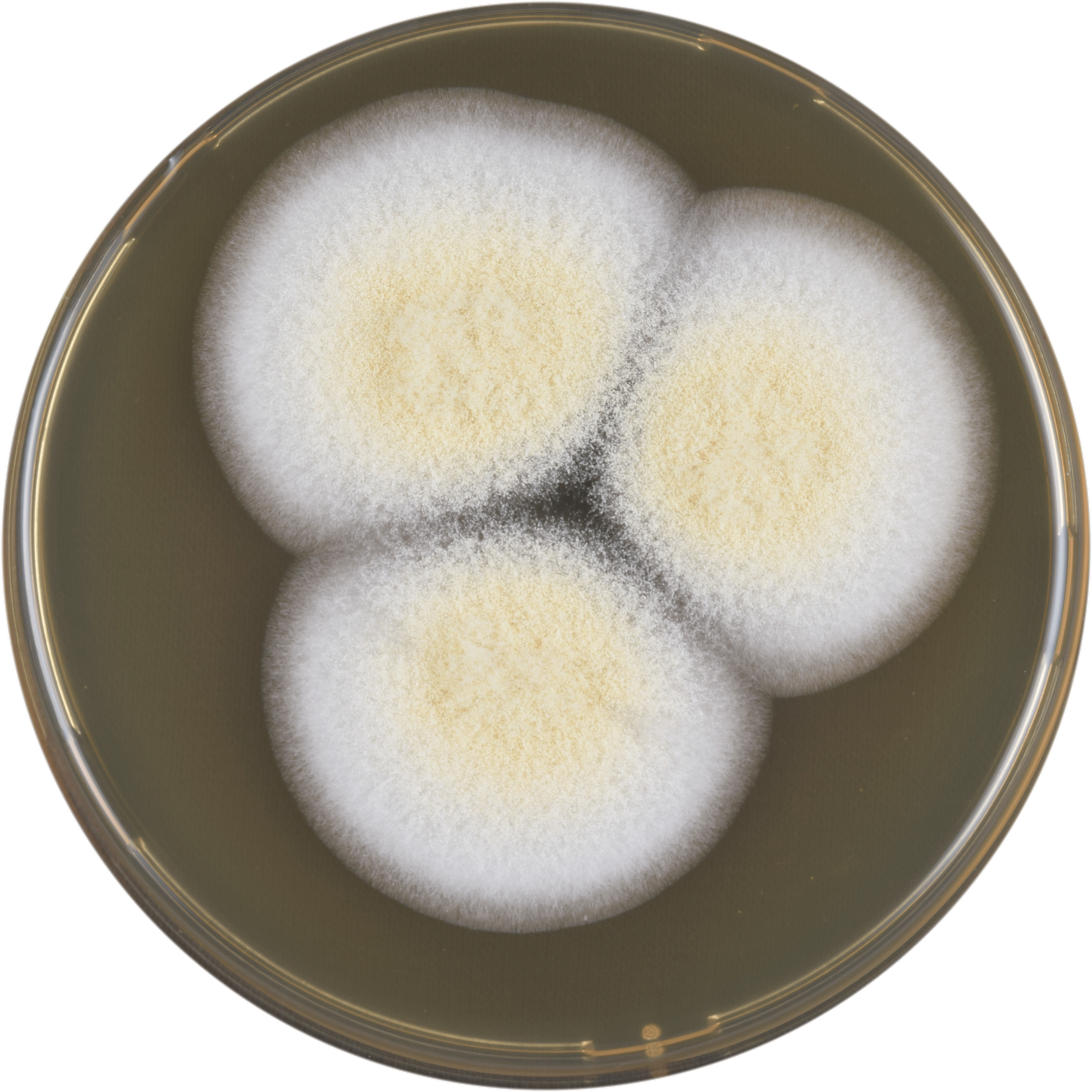
Aspergillus persii growing on MEAOX plate
