= Aspergillus cretensis =

Scientific classification
- Kingdom: Fungi
- Division: Ascomycota
- Class: Eurotiomycetes
- Order: Eurotiales
- Family: Aspergillaceae
- Genus: Aspergillus
- Species: A. cretensis

Binomial name
- Aspergillus cretensis Frisvad & Samson (2004)

Species of mold

Aspergillus cretensis is a species of fungus in the genus Aspergillus. It is from the Circumdati section. The species was first described in 2004. It has been reported to produce ochratoxin A and penicillic acid.

== Growth and morphology ==
A. cretensis has been cultivated on both Czapek yeast extract agar (CYA) plates and Malt Extract Agar Oxoid® (MEAOX) plates. The growth morphology of the colonies can be seen in the pictures below.

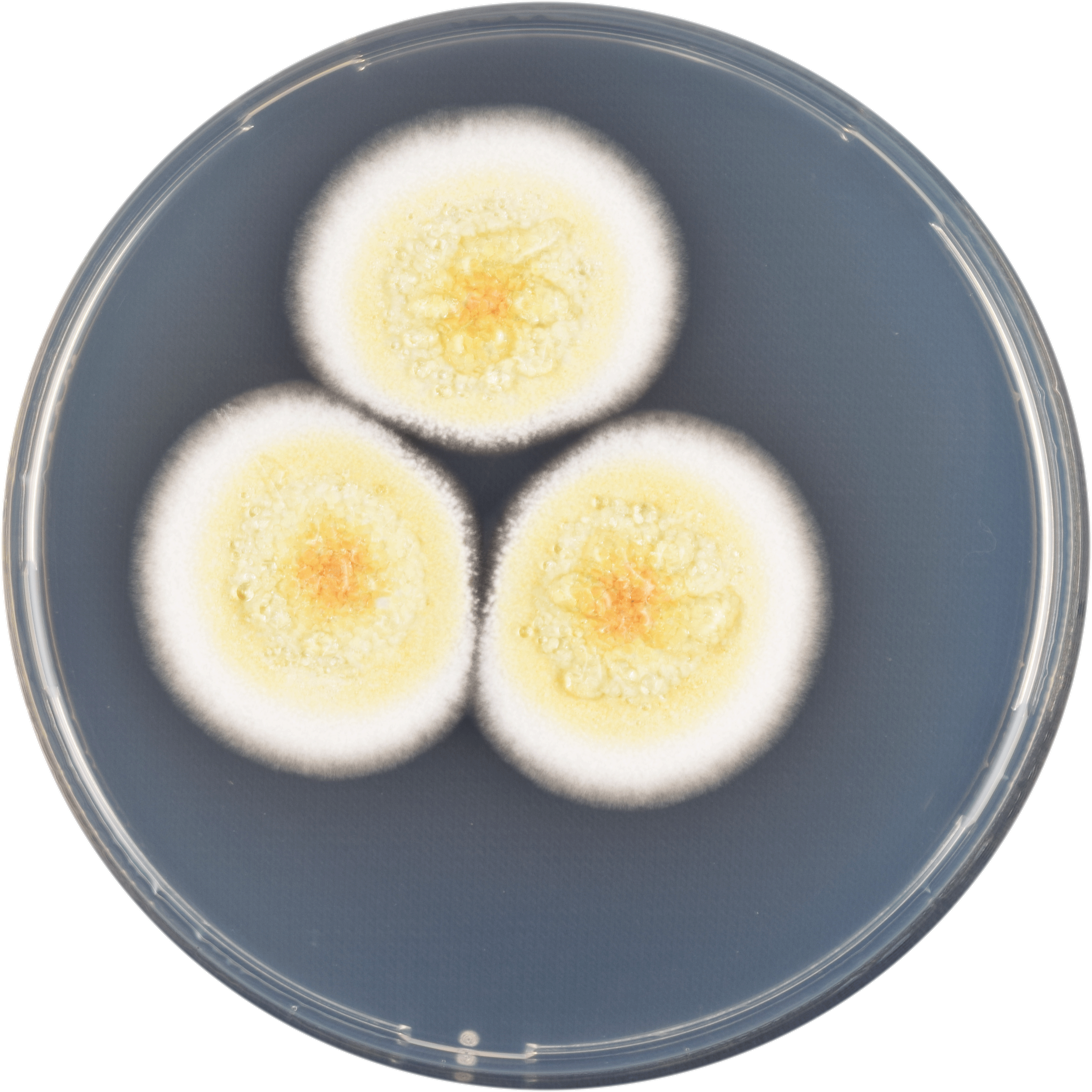
Aspergillus cretensis growing on CYA plate

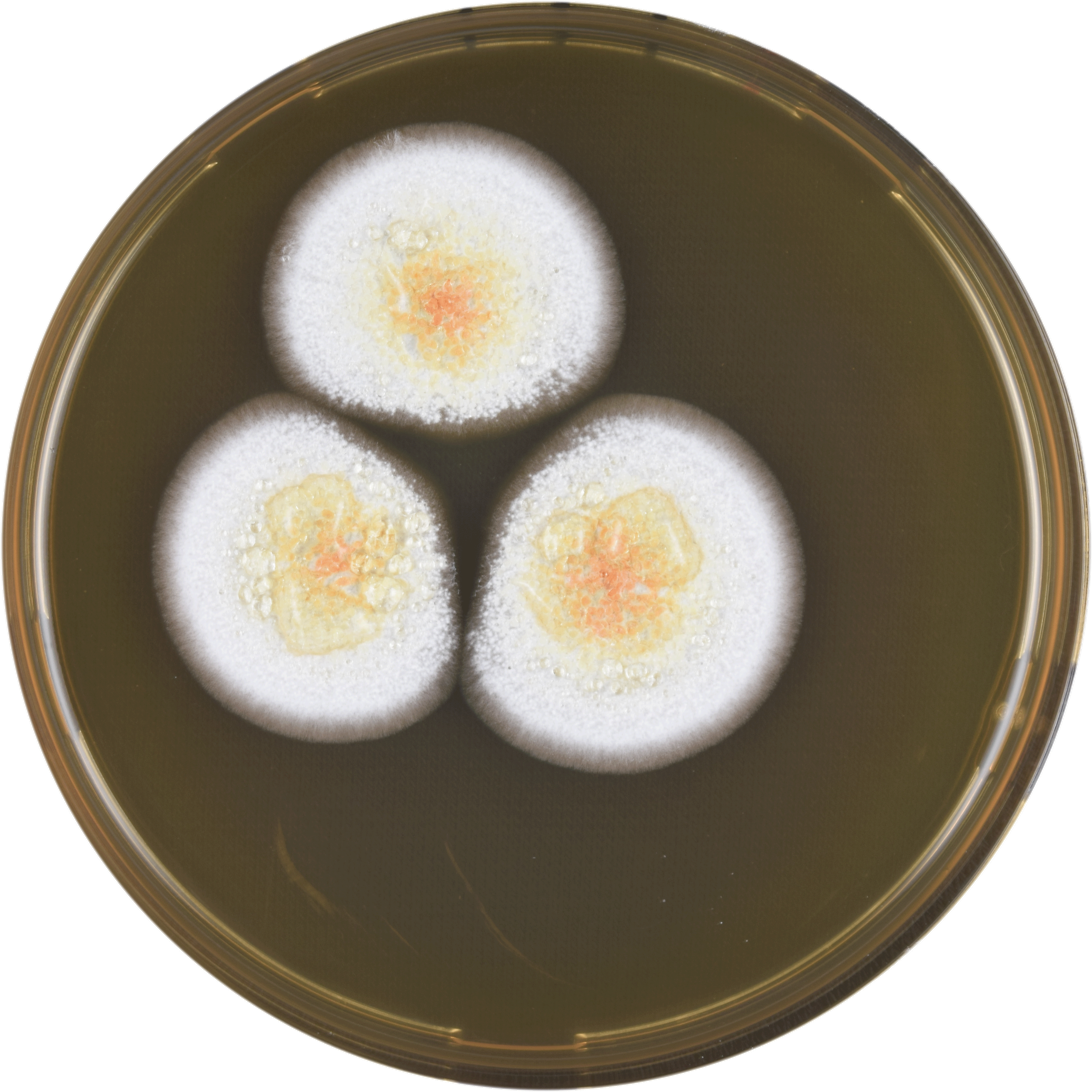
Aspergillus cretensis growing on MEAOX plate
