= Glycoside hydrolase family 28 =

Glycosyl hydrolases family 28
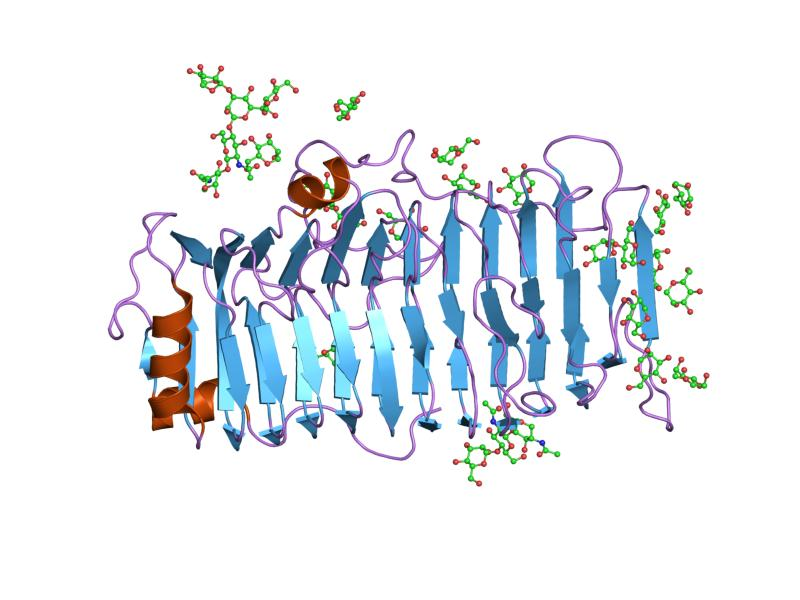
- rhamnogalacturonase a from aspergillus aculeatus

Identifiers
- Symbol: Glyco_hydro_28
- Pfam: PF00295
- Pfam clan: CL0268
- InterPro: IPR000743
- PROSITE: PDOC00415
- SCOP2: 1rmg / SCOPe / SUPFAM
- CAZy: GH28
- Membranome: 73
Available protein structures:
- PDB: IPR000743 PF00295 (ECOD; PDBsum)
- AlphaFold: IPR000743; PF00295

In molecular biology, glycoside hydrolase family 28 is a family of glycoside hydrolases EC 3.2.1., which are a widespread group of enzymes that hydrolyse the glycosidic bond between two or more carbohydrates, or between a carbohydrate and a non-carbohydrate moiety. A classification system for glycoside hydrolases, based on sequence similarity, has led to the definition of >100 different families. This classification is available on the CAZy web site, and also discussed at CAZypedia, an online encyclopedia of carbohydrate active enzymes.

Glycoside hydrolase family 28 CAZY GH_28 comprises enzymes with several known activities; polygalacturonase (EC 3.2.1.15); exo-polygalacturonase (EC 3.2.1.67); exo-polygalacturonase (EC 3.2.1.82); rhamnogalacturonase (EC not defined).

Polygalacturonase (PG) (pectinase) catalyzes the random hydrolysis of 1,4-alpha-D-galactosiduronic linkages in pectate and other galacturonans. In fruit, polygalacturonase plays an important role in cell wall metabolism during ripening. In plant bacterial pathogens such as Erwinia carotovora or Ralstonia solanacearum (Pseudomonas solanacearum) and fungal pathogens such as Aspergillus niger, polygalacturonase is involved in maceration and soft-rotting of plant tissue. Exo-poly-alpha-D-galacturonosidase (EC 3.2.1.82) (exoPG) hydrolyzes peptic acid from the non-reducing end, releasing digalacturonate. PG and exoPG share a few regions of sequence similarity, and belong to family 28 of the glycosyl hydrolases.
