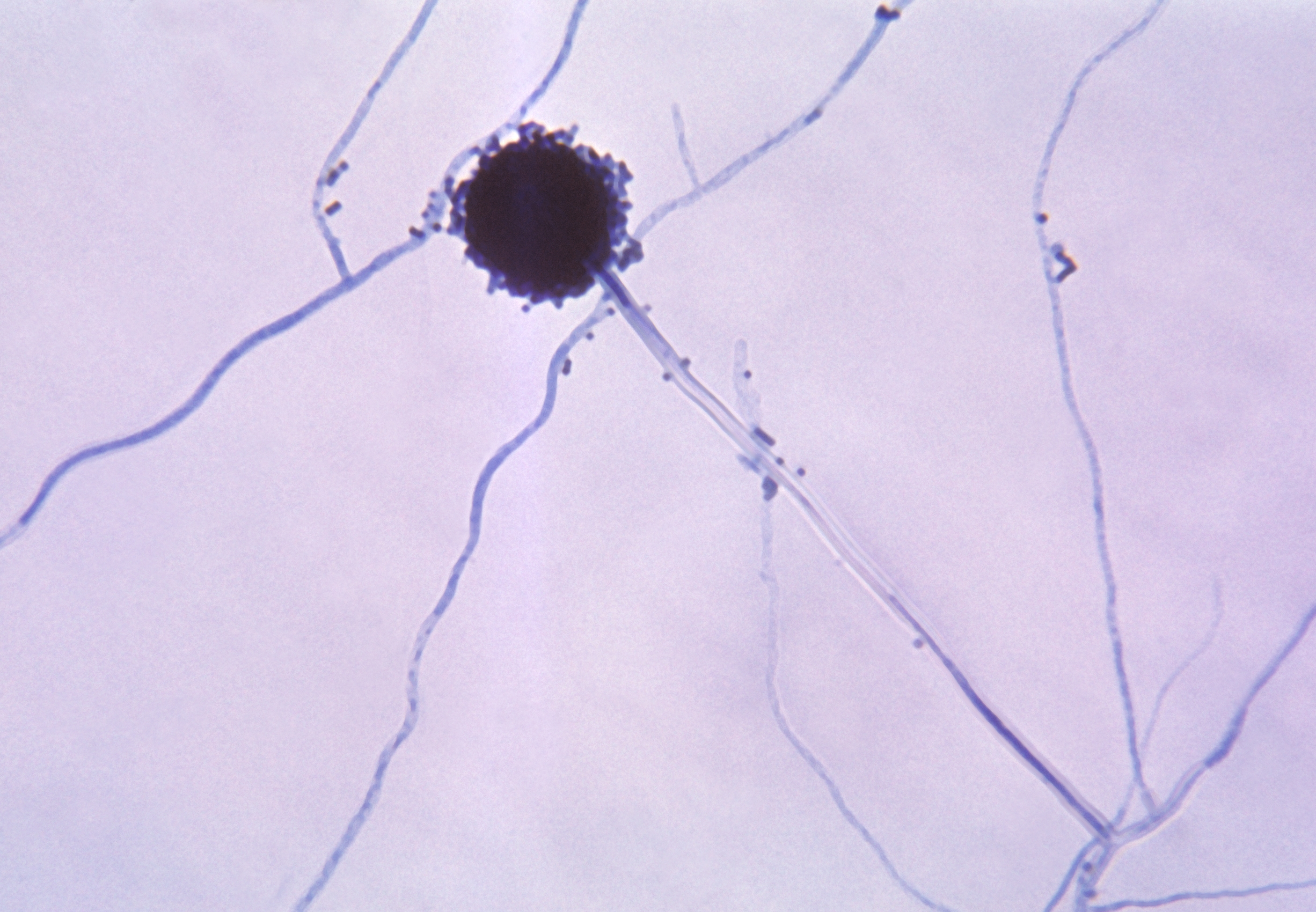
- Photomicrograph showing the conidial head (conidiophore) of Aspergillus niger
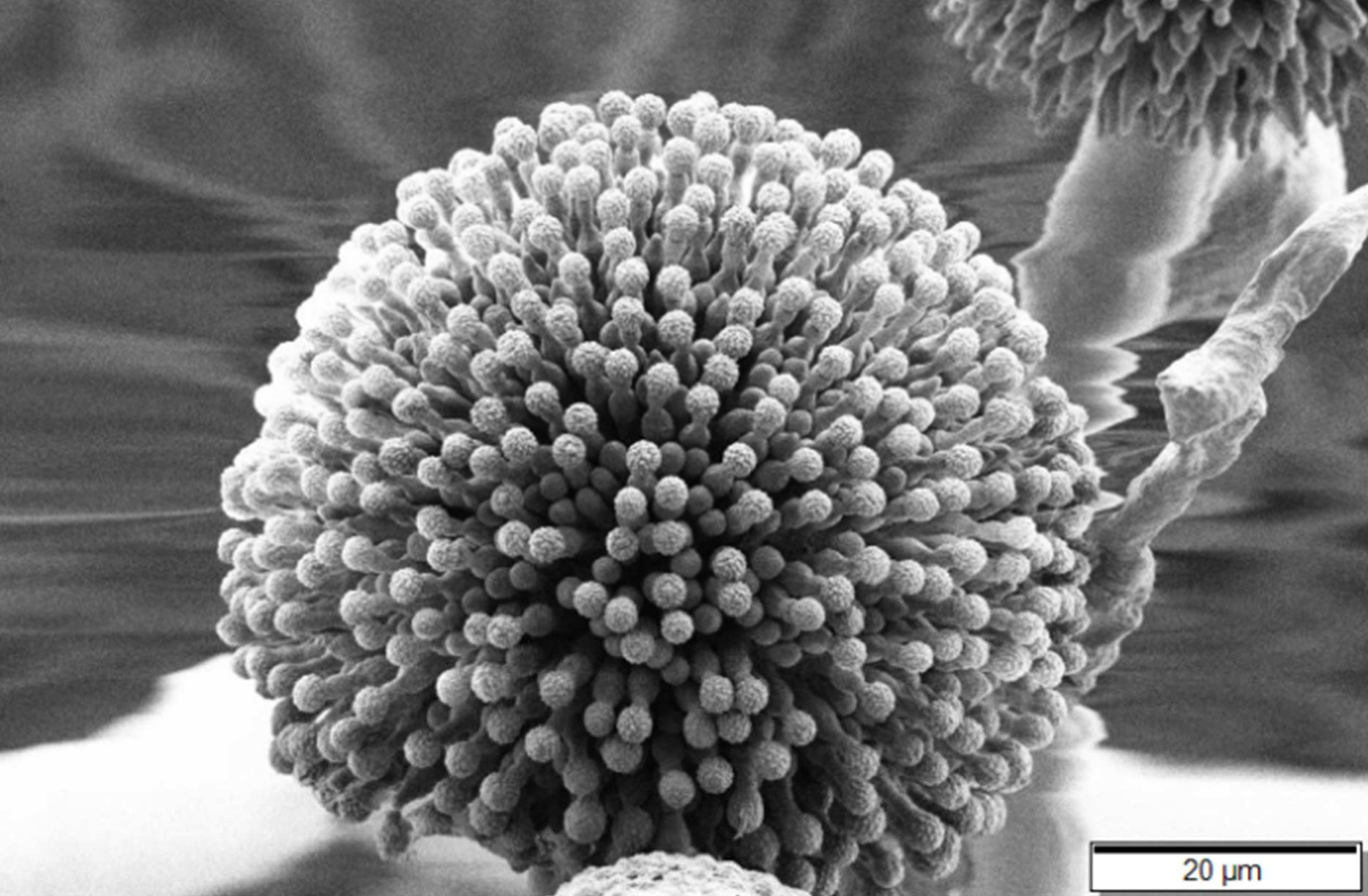
- Details of the head by scanning electron microscopy

Scientific classification
- Kingdom: Fungi
- Division: Ascomycota
- Class: Eurotiomycetes
- Order: Eurotiales
- Family: Aspergillaceae
- Genus: Aspergillus
- Species: A. niger

Binomial name
- Aspergillus niger van Tieghem 1867

Synonyms
- Aspergillus niger var. niger Aspergillopsis nigra (Tiegh.) Speg. Rhopalocystis nigra (Tiegh.) Grove; Sterigmatocystis nigra (Tiegh.) Sacc. (1877)

= Aspergillus niger =

Species of fungus

Aspergillus niger (/ˌæspərˈdʒɪləs/ /ˈnaɪdʒər/) is a mold classified within the Nigri section of the Aspergillus genus. The Aspergillus genus consists of common molds found throughout the environment within soil and water, on vegetation, in fecal matter, on decomposing matter, and suspended in the air. Species within this genus often grow quickly and can sporulate within a few days of germination. A combination of characteristics unique to A. niger makes the microbe invaluable to the production of many acids, proteins and bioactive compounds. Characteristics including extensive metabolic diversity, high production yield, secretion capability, and the ability to conduct post-translational modifications are responsible for A. niger's robust production of secondary metabolites. A. niger's capability to withstand extremely acidic conditions makes it effective as an industrial producer of citric acid.

A. niger causes a disease known as "black mold" on certain fruits and vegetables such as grapes, apricots, onions, and peanuts, and is a common contaminant of food. It is ubiquitous in soil and is commonly found in indoor environments, where its black colonies can be confused with those of Stachybotrys (species of which have also been called "black mold"). A. niger is classified as generally recognized as safe (GRAS) by the US Food and Drug Administration for use in food production, although the microbe is capable of producing toxins that affect human health.

== Taxonomy ==
Aspergillus niger is included in Aspergillus subgenus Circumdati, section Nigri. The section Nigri includes 15 related black-spored species that may be confused with A. niger, including A. tubingensis, A. foetidus, A. carbonarius, and A. awamori. In 2004, a number of morphologically similar species were described by Samson et al.

In 2007, the strain of ATCC 16404 Aspergillus niger was reclassified as Aspergillus brasiliensis (refer to publication by Varga et al.). This required an update to the U.S. Pharmacopoeia and the European Pharmacopoeia, which commonly use this strain throughout the pharmaceutical industry.

== Habitat and cultivation ==
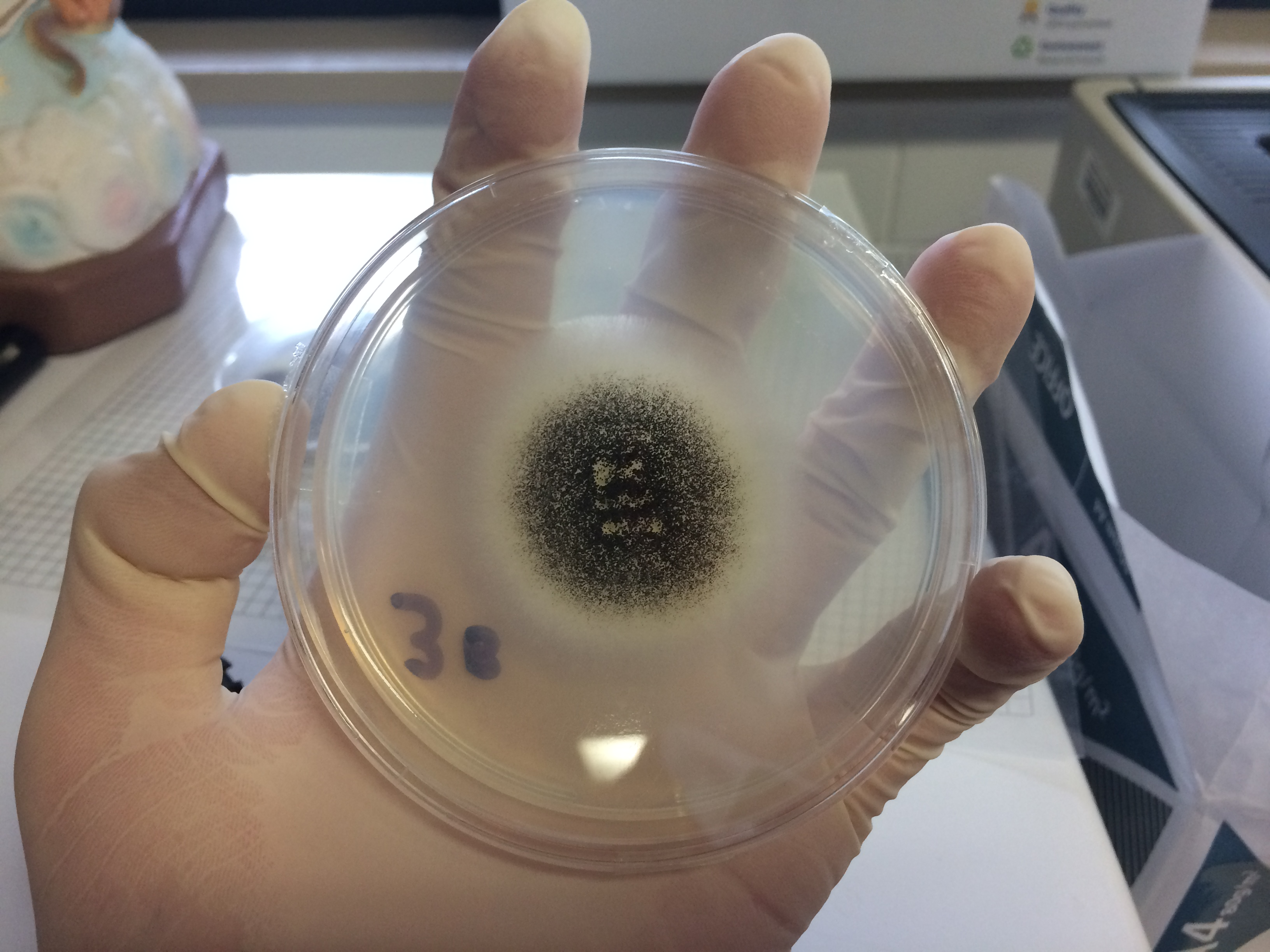
A. niger growing on potato dextrose agar

A. niger is a strict aerobe; therefore, it requires oxygen to grow. The fungus can grow in a range of environmental conditions; it can grow at temperatures ranging from 6 to 47 °C (43–117 °F). As a mesophile, its optimal temperature range is 35 to 37 °C (95–99 °F). It can tolerate pH ranging from 1.5 to 9.8. A. niger is xerophilic, meaning it can grow and reproduce in environments with very little water. It can also grow in humid conditions even tolerating environments with 90–100% relative humidity. A. niger spores have been found at altitudes of up to 58 km.

The fungus is most commonly grown on potato dextrose agar (PDA), but it can grow on many different types of growth media including Czapek-Dox agar, lignocellulose agar, and several others.

== Genome ==
Aspergillus niger has a genome consisting of roughly 34 megabases (Mb) organized into eight chromosomes. The DNA contains 10,785 genes that are transcribed and translated into 10,593 proteins.

Genomic information
- NCBI ID: 5061
- Ploidy: haploid
- Genome size: 34 Mb
- Number of chromosomes: 8

Two strains of A. niger have been sequenced. Strain CBS 513.88 produces enzymes used in industrial applications while strain ATCC 1015 is the wildtype strain of ATCC 11414 used to produce industrial citric acid (CA). The A. niger ATCC 1015 genome was sequenced by the Joint Genome Institute in a collaboration with other institutions. Completed sequences have been used to uncover orthologous genes and pathways involved in fungal metabolism, specifically the catabolism of monosaccharides. The ability of A. niger to change its metabolism depending on the carbon sources and other nutrients present in its environment has enabled the microorganism to survive and be found in almost all ecosystems. Further research is being done to study these mechanisms for all fungi using the complete sequenced genome of A. niger.

== Industrial uses ==
There are two ways in which Aspergillus niger can be grown for industrial purposes: solid state fermentation (SSF) and submerged fermentation (SmF). SSF uses a solid substrate with nutrients and minimal moisture to grow microorganisms. Nutrients such as nitrogen and carbon come from agricultural byproducts such as wheat bran, sugar pulp, rice husks, and corn flour. SSF gives better yield of microbe products and is more cost effective than SmF due to using agricultural byproducts. SSF is predominantly used over SmF. In SmF, microbes are grown in a liquid medium inside large aseptic fermentation vessels. These vessels are expensive pieces of equipment that provide more water for growth and allow for tight control of environmental factors, such as temperature and pH, that affects microbial growth.

Aspergillus niger is cultured to facilitate the industrial production of many substances. Various strains of A. niger are used in the industrial preparation of citric acid (E330) and gluconic acid (E574); therefore, they have been deemed acceptable for daily intake by the World Health Organization. A. niger fermentation is "generally recognized as safe" (GRAS) by the United States Food and Drug Administration under the Federal Food, Drug, and Cosmetic Act. A. niger is also being considered as a potential new source of natural food grade pigments.

The production of citric acid (CA) is achieved by growing strains of A. niger in a nutrient rich medium that includes high concentrations of sugar and mineral salts and an acidic pH of 2.5-3.5. Many microorganisms produce CA, but Aspergillus niger produces more than 1 million metric tons of CA annually via a fungal fermentation process. CA is in high demand for applications such as the control of microorganism growth, food and beverage flavor enhancement, acidity manipulation, pharmaceuticals, etc.

A. niger produces many useful enzymes for the catabolism of biopolymers in order to obtain nutrients from its environment. The production of specific enzymes can be increased for industrial purposes. For example, A. niger glucoamylase (P69328) is used in the production of high-fructose corn syrup and pectinases (GH28) are used in cider and wine clarification. Alpha-galactosidase (GH27), an enzyme that breaks down certain complex sugars, is a component of Beano and several other products that decrease flatulence. Another use for A. niger within the biotechnology industry is in the production of magnetic isotope-containing variants of biological macromolecules for NMR analysis. Aspergillus niger is also cultured for the extraction of the enzyme, glucose oxidase (P13006), used in the design of glucose biosensors, due to its high affinity for β-D-glucose.

In the food industry, A. niger is also cultured to isolate the enzyme fructosyltransferase to produce fructooligosaccharides (FOS). FOS are used to manufacture low-calorie and functional foods due to FOS characteristic ability to slow growth of pathogenic microorganisms in the intestines. These foods have prebiotic fiber among other health promoting properties. A. niger is not the only organism to produce the enzyme fructosyltransferase, but it has been found to produce the enzyme at rates conducive to industrial production. A specific use of A. niger within the food industry is its capability to produce enzymes like carbohydrase and cellulase, which are commonly used in the seafood industry for removing the bellies of clams during processing and removing the tough external skin of shrimp from their edible internal tissue.

Aspergillus niger can grow in gold-mining solutions containing cyano-metal complexes with gold, silver, copper, iron, and zinc. The fungus also plays a role in the solubilization of heavy-metal sulfides. A. niger has also been shown to remediate acid mine drainage through biosorption of copper and manganese.

== Toxicity ==
A. niger produces a wide variety of secondary metabolites, some of which are mycotoxins called ochratoxins, such as ochratoxin A. Contamination by filamentous fungi, such as A. niger, occurs frequently in grapes and grape based products resulting in contamination by ochratoxin A (OTA). OTA, a clinically relevant mycotoxin, can accumulate in human tissue and cause a variety of serious health conditions. Potential consequences of OTA poisoning include kidney damage, kidney failure and cancer but the United States Food and Drug Administration (FDA) has not set maximum permissible levels of OTA in food unlike the EU that set maximum permissible levels in a variety of food products.

== Pathogenicity ==
=== Plant pathogen ===
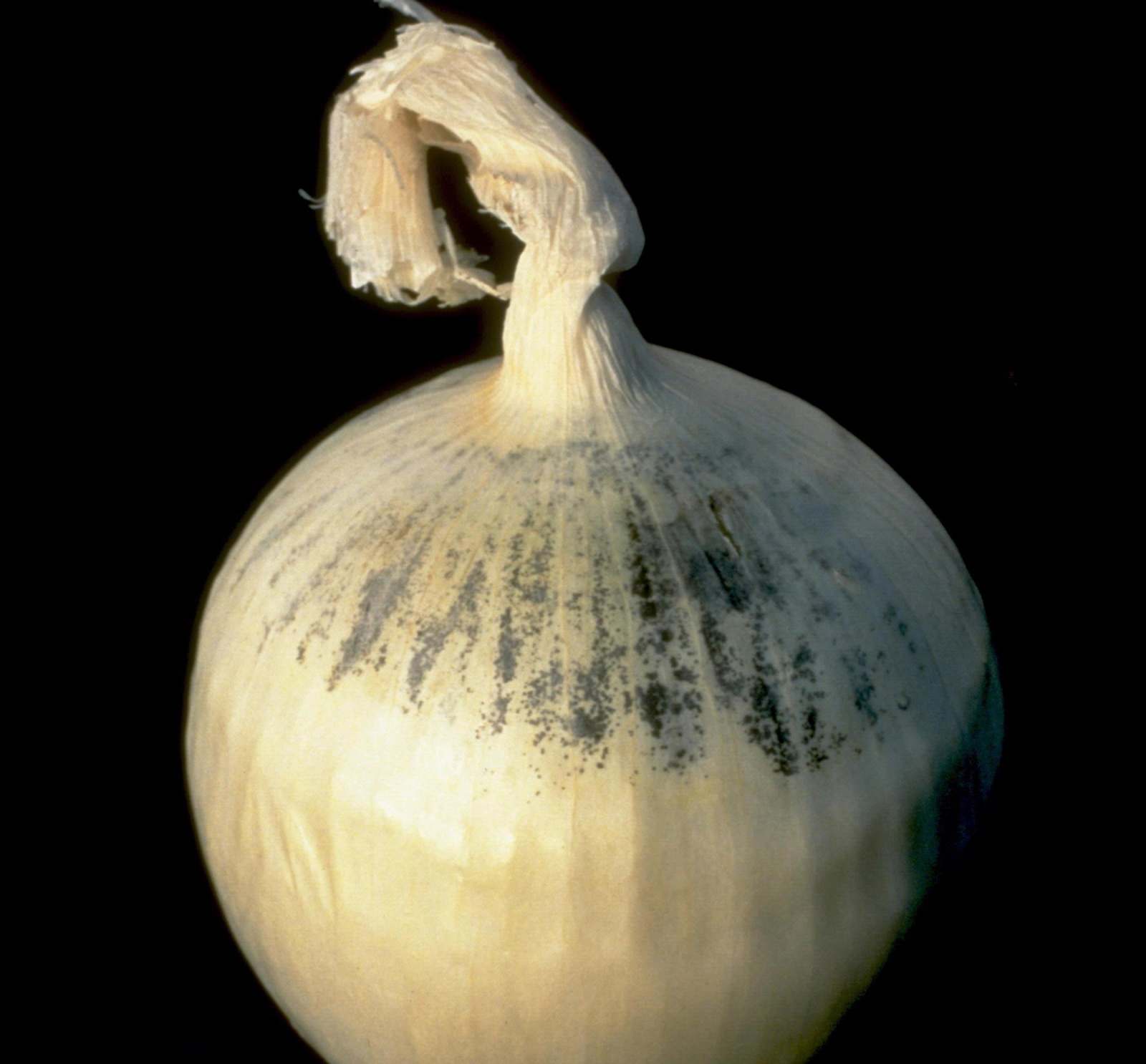
A. niger growing on onion

Aspergillus niger can cause black mold infections in certain legumes, fruits, and vegetables such as peanuts, grapes, and onions, leading to the fungus being a common food contaminant. This filamentous ascomycete has a tolerance to changes in pH, humidity, and heat, thriving in a temperature range from 15 to 53 °C (59 to 127 °F). These characteristics make infections of A. niger a common cause of post-harvest decay in fruits and vegetables, which can lead to significant economic loss in the food industry. A. niger infection in plants can cause a reduction in seed germination, seedling emergence, root elongation, and shoot elongation, causing the plant to perish before maturation. Specifically, Aspergillus niger causes sooty mold on onions and ornamental plants.

=== Human pathogen ===
A. niger is pathogenic. Aspergillosis is a fungal infection caused by spores of indoor and outdoor Aspergillus mold species. Due to the ubiquitous nature of A. niger, its spores are commonly inhaled by humans from their surrounding environment. Aspergillosis infection customarily occurs in people with compromised immune systems or pre-existing lung conditions like asthma and cystic fibrosis. Types of aspergillosis include allergic bronchopulmonary aspergillosis (ABPA), allergic aspergillus sinusitis, azole-resistant aspergillus fumigatus, cutaneous (skin) aspergillosis, and chronic pulmonary aspergillosis. Out of the approximated 180 species of aspergillus molds, roughly 40 species have been found to cause health concern in immunocompromised humans. Aspergillosis is particularly frequent among horticultural workers who often inhale peat dust, which can be rich in Aspergillus niger spores. The fungus has also been found in ancient Egyptian mummies and can be inhaled when they are disturbed. Otomycosis, which is a superficial fungal infection of the ear canal, is another disorder that can be caused by overgrowth of Aspergillus molds like A. niger. Otomycosis caused by A. niger is frequently associated with mechanical damage of the ear canal's external skin barrier and often presents itself in patients living in tropical climates. A. niger is rarely reported to cause pneumonia compared to other Aspergillus species, such as Aspergillus flavus, Aspergillus fumigatus, and Aspergillus terreus.

== Gallery ==
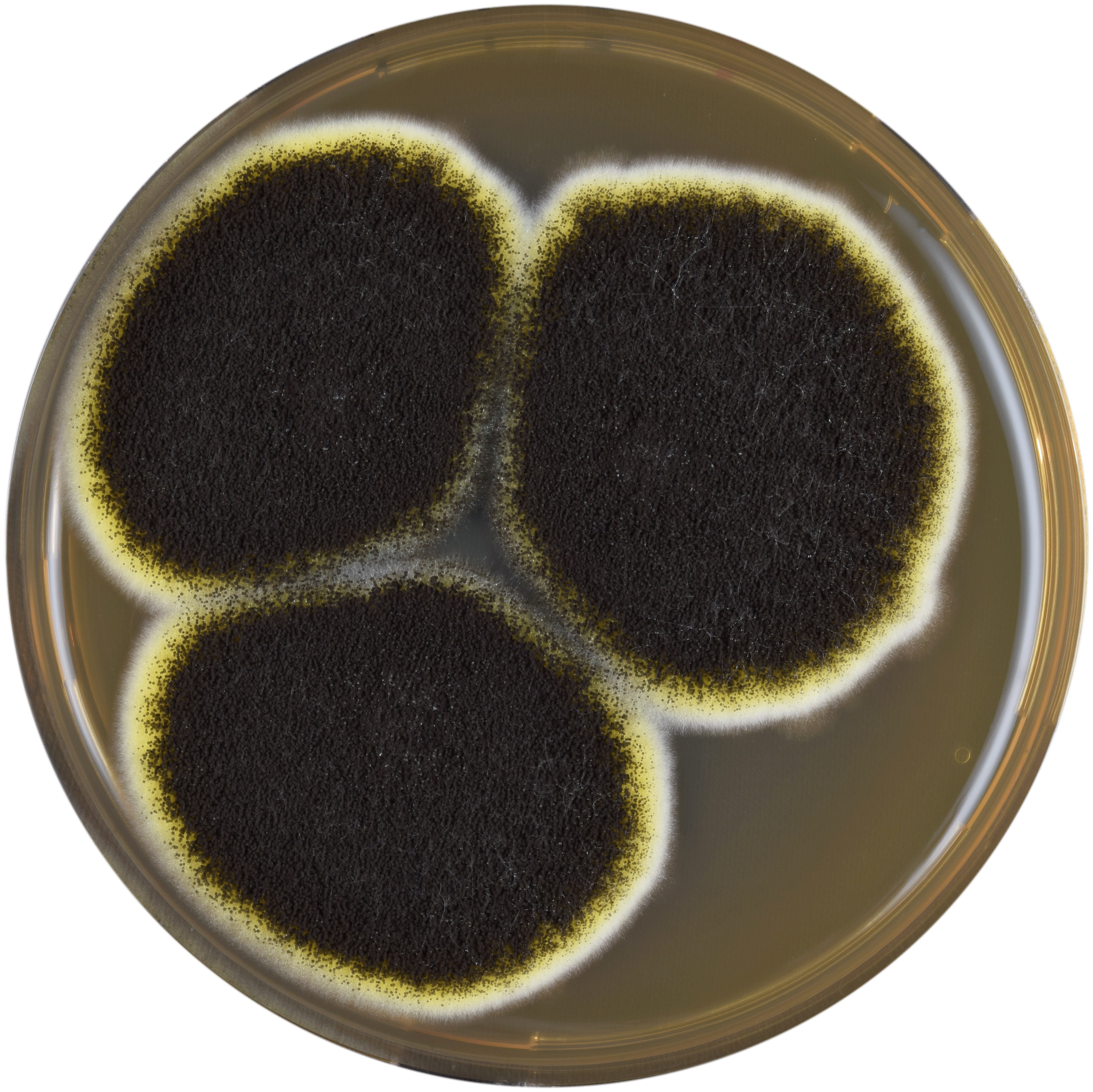
A. niger growing in a Petri dish

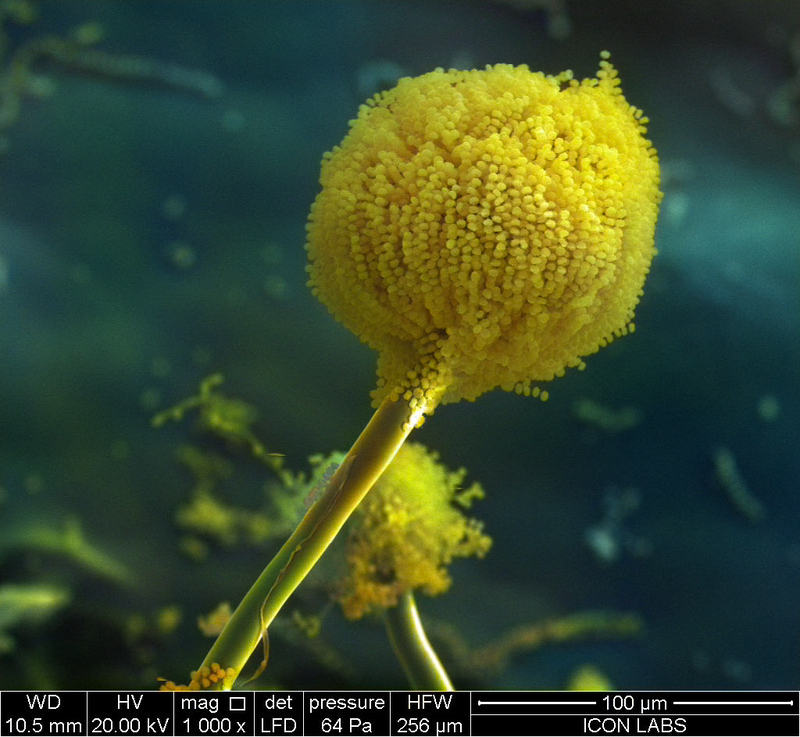
SEM micrograph of Aspergillus niger (strain: melanoliber) conodiophore possessing a large number of small conidospores (in false color). These spores release peptidomelanin into the surrounding medium during germination.

== See also ==
- Contamination control
