= Ochratoxin A =

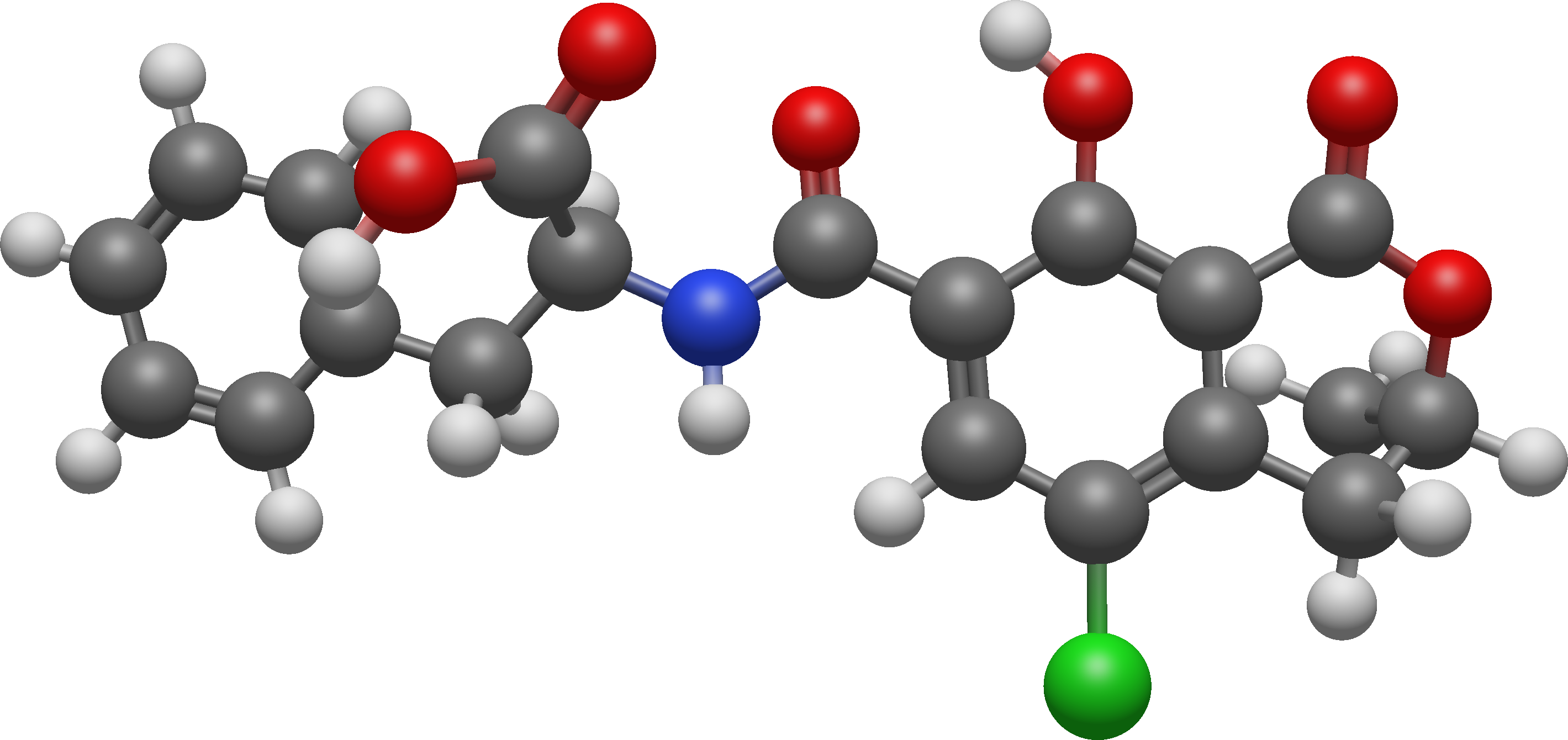

Names
- IUPAC name N-[(3R)-5-Chloro-8-hydroxy-3-methyl-1-oxo-3,4-dihydro-1H-2-benzopyran-7-carbonyl]-L-phenylalanine
- Systematic IUPAC name (2S)-2-[(3R)-5-Chloro-8-hydroxy-3-methyl-1-oxo-3,4-dihydro-1H-2-benzopyran-7-carboxamido]-3-phenylpropanoic acid
- Other names (R)-N- [(5-Chloro- 3,4-dihydro- 8-hydroxy- 3-methyl- 1-oxo- 1H-2-benzopyran-7-yl) -carbonyl]- L- phenylalanine (−)-N- [(5-Chloro- 8-hydroxy- 3-methyl- 1-oxo- 7-isochromanyl) carbonyl]- 3-phenylalanine

Identifiers
CAS Number	303-47-9
3D model (JSmol)	Interactive image
ChEBI	CHEBI:7719
ChEMBL	ChEMBL589366
ChemSpider	390954
ECHA InfoCard	100.005.586
EC Number	206-143-7
IUPHAR/BPS	4672
KEGG	C09955
PubChem CID	442530
UNII	1779SX6LUY
UN number	2811
CompTox Dashboard (EPA)	DTXSID7021073
- InChI: InChI=1S/C20H18ClNO6/c1-10-7-12-14(21)9-13(17(23)16(12)20(27)28-10)18(24)22-15(19(25)26)8-11-5-3-2-4-6-11/h2-6,9-10,15,23H,7-8H2,1H3,(H,22,24)(H,25,26)/t10-,15+/m1/s1 Key: RWQKHEORZBHNRI-BMIGLBTASA-N; InChI=1/C20H18ClNO6/c1-10-7-12-14(21)9-13(17(23)16(12)20(27)28-10)18(24)22-15(19(25)26)8-11-5-3-2-4-6-11/h2-6,9-10,15,23H,7-8H2,1H3,(H,22,24)(H,25,26)/t10-,15+/m1/s1 Key: RWQKHEORZBHNRI-BMIGLBTABQ
- SMILES: O=C(O)[C@@H](NC(=O)c1c(O)c2c(c(Cl)c1)C[C@H](OC2=O)C)Cc3ccccc3

Properties
Chemical formula	C_{20}H_{18}ClNO_{6}
Molar mass	403.813
Melting point	169 °C (336 °F; 442 K)

Hazards
- GHS labelling
Pictograms	(GHS06: Toxic) (GHS07: Exclamation mark) (GHS09: Environmental hazard)
Signal word	Danger
Hazard statements	H300, H351, H413
Precautionary statements	P203, P260, P264, P264+P265, P270, P271, P273, P280, P284, P301+P316, P304+P340, P305+P351+P338, P316, P318, P320, P321, P330, P337+P317, P403+P233, P405, P501
- Except where otherwise noted, data are given for materials in their standard state (at 25 °C [77 °F], 100 kPa). verify (what is ?) Infobox references

Ochratoxin A—a toxin produced by different Aspergillus and Penicillium species—is one of the most-abundant food-contaminating mycotoxins. It is also a frequent contaminant of water-damaged houses and of heating ducts. Human exposure can occur through consumption of contaminated food products, particularly contaminated grain and pork products, as well as coffee, wine grapes, and dried grapes. The toxin has been found in the tissues and organs of animals, including human blood and breast milk. Ochratoxin A, like most toxic substances, has large species- and sex-specific toxicological differences.

== Impact on human and animal health ==
=== Carcinogenicity ===
Ochratoxin A is potentially carcinogenic to humans (Group 2B), and has been shown to be weakly mutagenic, possibly by induction of oxidative DNA damage.

The evidence in experimental animals is sufficient to indicate carcinogenicity of ochratoxin A. It was tested for carcinogenicity by oral administration in mice and rats. It slightly increased the incidence of hepatocellular carcinomas in mice of each sex. and produced renal adenomas and carcinomas in male mice and in rats (carcinomas in 46% of males and 5% of females). In humans, very little histology data is available, so a relationship between ochratoxin A and renal cell carcinoma has not been found. However, the incidence of transitional cell (urothelial) urinary cancers seems abnormally high in Balkan endemic nephropathy patients, especially for the upper urinary tract. The molecular mechanism of ochratoxin A carcinogenicity has been under debate due to conflicting literature, however this mycotoxin has been proposed to play a major role in reducing antioxidant defenses.

=== Neurotoxicity ===
Ochratoxin A has a strong affinity for the brain, especially the cerebellum (Purkinje cells), ventral mesencephalon, and hippocampal structures. The affinity for the hippocampus could be relevant to the pathogenesis of Alzheimer's disease, and subchronic administration to rodents induces hippocampal neurodegeneration. Ochratoxin causes acute depletion of striatal dopamine, which constitutes the bed of Parkinson's disease, but it did not cause cell death in any of brain regions examined. Teams from Zheijiang Univ. and Kiel Univ. hold that ochratoxin may contribute to Alzheimer's and to Parkinson's diseases. Nonetheless, their study was performed in vitro and may not extrapolate to humans. The developing brain is very susceptible to ochratoxin, hence the need for caution during pregnancy.

== Immunosuppression and immunotoxicity ==
Ochratoxin A can cause immunosuppression and immunotoxicity in animals. The toxin's immunosuppressant activity in animals may include depressed antibody responses, reduced size of immune organs (such as the thymus, spleen, and lymph nodes), changes in immune cell number and function, and altered cytokine production. Immunotoxicity probably results from cell death following apoptosis and necrosis, in combination with slow replacement of affected immune cells due to inhibition of protein synthesis.

=== Potential link to nephropathies ===
Balkan endemic nephropathy (BEN), a slowly progressive renal disease, appeared in the middle of the 20th century, highly localized around the Danube, but only hitting certain households. Patients over the years develop kidney failure that requires dialysis or transplantation. The initial symptoms are those of a tubulointerstitial nephritis of the sort met with after toxic aggressions to the proximal convoluted tubules. Such proximal tubule nephropathies can be induced by aluminium (e.g. in antiperspirants), antibiotics (vancomycin, aminosides), tenofovir (for AIDS), and cisplatin. Their symptoms are well known to nephrologists: glycosuria without hyperglycemia, microalbuminuria, poor urine concentration capacity, impaired urine acidification, and yet long-lasting normal creatinine clearance. In BEN, renal biopsy shows acellular interstitial fibrosis, tubular atrophy, and karyomegaly in proximal convoluted tubules. A number of descriptive studies have suggested a correlation between exposure to ochratoxin A and BEN, and have found a correlation between its geographical distribution and a high incidence of, and mortality from, urothelial urinary tract tumours. However, insufficient information is currently available to conclusively link ochratoxin A to BEN. The toxin may require synergistic interactions with predisposing genotypes or other environmental toxicants to induce this nephropathy. Ochratoxin possibly is not the cause of this nephropathy, and many authors are in favor of aristolochic acid, that is contained in a plant: birthwort (Aristolochia clematitis). Nevertheless, although many of the pieces of scientific evidence are lacking and/or need serious re-evaluation, it remains that ochratoxin, in pigs, demonstrates direct correlation between exposure and onset and progression of nephropathy. This porcine nephropathy bears typical signs of toxicity to proximal tubules: loss of ability to concentrate urine, glycosuria, and histological proximal tubule degeneration.

Other nephropathies, although not responding to the "classical" definition of BEN, may be linked to ochratoxin. Thus, this could in certain circumstances be the case for focal segmental glomerulosclerosis after inhalational exposure: such a glomerulopathy with noteworthy proteinuria has been described in patients with very high urinary ochratoxin levels (around 10 times levels that can be met with in "normal" subjects, i.e. around 10 ppb or 10 ng/ml).

=== Food animal industry impact ===
Ochratoxin-contaminated feed has its major economic impact on the poultry industry. Chickens, turkeys, and ducklings are susceptible to this toxin. Clinical signs of avian ochratoxicosis generally involve reduction in weight gains, poor feed conversion, reduced egg production, and poor egg shell quality. Economic losses occur also in swine farms, linked to nephropathy and costs for the disposal of carcasses.

Toxicity does not seem to constitute a problem in cattle, as the rumen harbors protozoa that hydrolyze OTA. However, contamination of milk is a possibility.

=== Dietary guidelines ===
Concentrations of ochratoxin in usual foods
Source	Median in μg/kg of food	Median in ng/kg of food	Weight in kg	Diet 1	Diet 1+
Liquorice extract	26.30	26,300			
Ginger	5.50	5,500	0.005	27.50	
Nutmeg	2.27	2,265	0.005	11.33	
Paprika	1.32	1,315	0.005	6.58	
Pig liver	1.10	1,100			
Ginseng	1.10	1,100			
Raisins dry	0.95	950	0.1	95.00	
Pig kidney	0.80	800	0.2		160
Liquorice confectionery	0.17	170			
Coffee	0.13	125	0.3	37.50	
Cereals	0.09	87.5	0.5	43.75	
Peanuts	0.08	79	0.2		15.80
Wine	0.05	50	0.5	25	
Pulses	0.05	49.5	0.5	24.75	
Beer	0.05	49			
Salami	0.05	49	0.3	14.70	
			Total in ng	286.11	461.91

EFSA established in 2006 the "tolerable weekly intake" (TWI) of ochratoxin A (on advice of the Scientific Panel on Contaminants in the Food Chain) at 120 ng/kg., equivalent to a tolerable daily intake (TDI) of 14 ng/kg. Other organizations have established even lower limits for intake of ochratoxin A, based on the consumption habits of the population. For USA, the FDA considers a TDI of 5 ng/kg. In the US, mean body weight for men is 86 kg, and for women 74 kg. Hence, the TDI for men is 430 ng and for women is 370 ng. In the joined table "weight in kg" is the weight eaten per day of each of the listed foodstuffs. Diet 1, with small quantities of ginger, nutmeg, and paprika, a good serving of dry raisins, a reasonable amount of coffee, cereals, wine, pulses, and salami, amounts to a safe diet (as for ochratoxin, at least), with 286 ng per day. However, it would be easy to go into excessive levels (Diet 1+), just by eating 200 g of pig kidney and 200 g of peanuts, which would lead to a total of nearly 462 ng of ochratoxin. This shows how delicate a safe diet can be.

Tolerable daily intake 5 ng/kg
Gender	Weight in kg	Tolerable OTA in ng
male	86	430
female	74	370

Although ochratoxin A is not held as of today as responsible for renal cell carcinoma (RCC), the most frequent renal cancer, it is frequently written that dietary pattern might decrease or increase the risk of RCC. A Uruguayan case-control study correlates intake of meat with occurrence of RCC. A very large prospective cohort in Sweden explores correlations between RCC occurrence, diets rich in vegetables and poultry (so-called "healthy diets"), and diets rich in meat (especially processed meat: salami, black pudding). The thesis defended is that more fruit and vegetables might have a protective role. Fruit (except raisins and dried fruit) are very poor in ochratoxin, and processed meat can be rich in ochratoxin.

== Dermal exposure ==
Ochratoxin A can permeate through the human skin. Although no significant health risk is expected after dermal contact in agricultural or residential environments, skin exposure to ochratoxin A should nevertheless be limited.

== Genetic resistance ==
In 1975, Woolf et al. proposed that the inherited disorder phenylketonuria protects against ochratoxin A poisoning through the production of high levels of phenylalanine. Ochratoxin is a competitive inhibitor of phenylalanine in the phenylalanyl-tRNA-synthetase-catalyzed reaction thus preventing protein synthesis, which can be reversed by introducing phenylalanine, which is in excess in PKU individuals.

== See also ==
- Ochratoxin
