= Tayloriellina =

Scientific classification
- Kingdom: Fungi
- Division: Ascomycota
- Class: Lecanoromycetes
- Order: Teloschistales
- Family: Teloschistaceae
- Genus: Tayloriellina; S.Y.Kondr., Kärnefelt, A.Thell, Elix & Hur (2016)

Type species
- Tayloriella erythrosticta (Taylor) S.Y.Kondr., Kärnefelt, A.Thell, Elix, Jung Kim, A.S.Kondr. & Hur (2016)

Species
- T. erythrosticta T. malmeana T. microphyllina

Synonyms
- Tayloriellina S.Y.Kondr., Kärnefelt, A.Thell, Elix & Hur (2015)

Genus of lichens

Tayloriellina is a genus of lichen-forming fungi in the family Teloschistaceae. It was described in 2015 as Tayloriella, but renamed in 2016 because that name was preoccupied by a red alga. Currently, three species are recognized in Tayloriellina, found in Australia, North and South America, and the Russian Far East. Some authors have treated Tayloriellina as part of Villophora, while others continue to recognise it as a separate lineage.

== Taxonomy ==
The genus was introduced in 2015 under the name Tayloriella to accommodate the Australian sorediate teloschistoid lichen centred on Thomas Taylor's 1847 species Lecanora erythrosticta, and was placed in the family Teloschistaceae within the then newly recognised subfamily Brownlielloideae; the type species was fixed as Tayloriella erythrosticta. Because Tayloriella was already occupied by a red-algal genus (a later homonym), the lichen genus was promptly renamed Tayloriellina (nom. nov.), and the type was recombined accordingly as Tayloriellina erythrosticta.

A 2021 multi-gene study (nrITS, nrLSU, mrSSU) placed Tayloriellina within the subfamily Teloschistoideae and showed it to be very close to Villophora. In the ITS-only tree, Tayloriellina is recovered as the immediate sister lineage to Villophora, whereas the three-gene analysis sets Villophora nearer to Tassiloa, Josefpoeltia and Teloschistes with Tayloriellina slightly more distant. The authors therefore transferred the North American Villophora microphyllina to Tayloriellina as T. microphyllina, and document that T. microphyllina and the Australian T. erythrosticta form a species pair. They add that broader, many-gene datasets could yet show Tayloriellina nested within Villophora, they nevertheless retained it as a separate genus.

A concurrent family-level revision with broader South American sampling recovered Tayloriellina within the Villophora clade and reduced it to synonymy, recombining the type as Villophora erythrosticta; in that topology V. erythrosticta forms a well-supported clade with V. microphyllina and an undescribed Villophora. The same study re-evaluated the data used to propose Brownlielloideae, showed that it included non-Teloschistaceae sequences, and treated Brownlielloideae as a synonym of Teloschistoideae.

More recently (2023), a Bolivian species was described as Tayloriellina malmeana from dry Interandean Valles. A molecular analysis placed it as sister to T. microphyllina, forming an American lineage within Tayloriellina. This treatment indicates continued use of Tayloriellina in recent work despite earlier proposals to merge it with Villophora.

== Description ==
In the protologue (as Tayloriella), the genus is described as a bark-dwelling, crustose lichen whose thallus breaks into very small, often poorly developed, orange to orange-reddish brown patches (areoles). It is sorediate: powdery reproductive granules (soredia) are present, and the soralia (small patches where they emerge) are usually infrequent, ranging from pin-point dots to small craters. These can spread to form a sorediose film that may cover much of the thallus, and the soredia may become short, warty granules (isidioid). Fertile discs (apothecia) are usually plentiful; they are ringed by a rim of thallus tissue (zeorine form) and have bright brownish-red to brownish-orange centres. Anatomically, the firm rim around the disc (the true exciple) consists of dense, short-celled tissue embedded in a well-developed matrix, while the outer cortex contributed by the thallus (the thalline exciple) is a palisade of rounded to spherical cells. The ascospores are long and narrow with a single broad cross-wall (two-celled). The thallus contains orange anthraquinone pigments of the parietin group together with O-methylvioxanthin.

All sampled species of Tayloriellina share the same pigment profile as Villophora: chemosyndrome A as defined by Ulrik Søchting, dominated by parietin (about 92–95%) with minor teloschistin (~1%), fallacinal (2–3%), parietinic acid (1–2%) and emodin (1–2%); all yellow-orange to reddish parts react K+ (purple).

== Habitat and distribution ==
Tayloriellina species are bark- or wood-dwelling crusts, occurring on corticolous (bark) or lignicolous (wood) substrates. The type species, T. erythrosticta, is Australian and has been recorded on wood; T. microphyllina was originally reported to occur in North America on bark. It was later confirmed from the Primorye Territory of the Russian Far East, where it is common in the dry and arid conditions of the Quercus mongolica–Pinus × funebris forests there.

== Species ==
- Tayloriellina erythrosticta (Taylor) S.Y.Kondr., Kärnefelt, A.Thell, Elix, Jung Kim, A.S.Kondr. & Hur (2016)
- Tayloriellina malmeana Wilk (2023)
- Tayloriellina microphyllina (Tuck.) Søchting & Arup (2021)
