= Scutaria =

Scientific classification
- Domain: Eukaryota
- Kingdom: Fungi
- Division: Ascomycota
- Class: Lecanoromycetes
- Order: Teloschistales
- Family: Teloschistaceae
- Genus: Scutaria; Søchting, Arup & Frödén (2013)
- Species: S. andina

Binomial name
- Scutaria andina (Räsänen) Søchting, Frödén & Arup (2013)

Synonyms
- Xanthoria andina Räsänen (1939); Caloplaca andina (Räsänen) Scutari, Søchting & Rosato (2002)

Genus of lichens

Scutaria is a single-species fungal genus in the family Teloschistaceae. It contains the species Scutaria andina, found in South America. The thallus of this lichen has a form that is intermediate between crustose and foliose.

== Taxonomy ==
The genus was circumscribed in 2013 by the lichenologists Ulrik Søchting, Ulf Arup, and Patrick Frödén. The genus name honours the Argentinian lichenologist Nora Scutari. Scutaria andina was first formally described by Veli Räsänen in 1939, who classified it as a species of Xanthoria. Scutari and colleagues had proposed to transfer the taxon to the genus Caloplaca in 2002.

Phylogenetically, Scutaria is sister to a clade containing the genera Josefpoeltia, Teloschistes, and Villophora; the entire group forms a well-supported clade with Wetmoreana. Scutaria is in the subfamily Teloschistoideae of the family Teloschistaceae.

== Description ==
Scutaria forms an effigurate (irregularly branched or spread out) and almost lobate (having lobe-like structures) thallus. This thallus is often coated with a fine, powdery substance (pruina) and attaches to the substrate through individual hyphae (fungus filaments) and hyphal strands. The outer layer of the lichen, known as the cortex, is intricately structured with tightly interwoven cells (prosoplectenchyma).

The apothecia (fruiting bodies) are common in Scutaria and are mostly zeorine type, where the margin is less distinct. These apothecia are typically pinkish and often have a pruinose coating. The spores produced by these apothecia are polar-diblastic, meaning they are divided into two components (locules) separated by a central septum with a perforation or isthmus. Pycnidia, which are small, flask-shaped asexual reproductive structures, are mostly present in Scutaria. The conidia (asexual spores), produced within these pycnidia are rod-shaped (bacilliform).

In terms of chemistry, Scutaria is primarily characterised by the presence of fragilin, a secondary metabolite (lichen product), with occasional small amounts of other substances like parietin, emodin, and 7-chloroparietinic acid.

== Habitat and distribution ==
Scutaria andina is found in South America, where it typically grows on twigs. Originally described from specimens collected in Argentina, molecular analysis was later used to confirm its presence in Bolivia.
