= Catenarina =

Scientific classification
- Domain: Eukaryota
- Kingdom: Fungi
- Division: Ascomycota
- Class: Lecanoromycetes
- Order: Teloschistales
- Family: Teloschistaceae
- Genus: Catenarina; Søchting, Søgaard, Arup, Elvebakk & Elix (2014)

Type species
- Catenarina desolata Søchting, Søgaard & Elvebakk (2014)

Species
- C. desolata C. iomma C. vivasiana

Genus of lichens

Catenarina is a genus of lichen-forming fungi in the family Teloschistaceae consisting of three species. These crustose lichens are characterized by their reddish-brown pigmentation and the presence of the secondary compound 7-chlorocatenarin. The genus is found in the southernmost regions of the Southern Hemisphere, including Antarctica, southern Patagonia, and the Kerguelen Islands.

== Taxonomy ==
Catenarina was circumscribed as a new genus in 2014 by the lichenologists Ulrik Søchting, Majbrit Søgaard, Ulf Arup, Arve Elvebakk, and John Elix. The genus is named after its predominant secondary metabolite, catenarin. The type species for this genus is Catenarina desolata. Three species were included in the original description of the genus: two newly described species, and one (C. iomma) transferred from Caloplaca.

Catenarina is nested within the subfamily Teloschistoideae and forms a sister clade to a group of three genera: Villophora, Teloschistes, and Josefpoeltia. However, this relationship is not well-supported. The genus is genetically well-separated from other genera in the subfamily, but its exact position within the subfamily is not firmly established. The unique chemistry of the three Catenarina species, combined with the results of phylogenetic analyses, supports the recognition of a new genus within the family Teloschistaceae. Later molecular analysis showed Tassiloa as a sister group to Catenarina.

== Description ==
The thallus of Catenarina species is crustose, saxicolous (rock-dwelling) or lichenicolous (lichen-dwelling), and can be thick or disappearing. It is grey or reddish-brown in colour. The apothecia are sparse or abundant, and have a zeorine form with a reddish disc. Spores are polar-diblastic. The secondary chemistry of Catenarina includes the presence of 7-chloroemodin as a major lichen product, and variable amounts of the related compounds emodin, 7-chlorocitreorosein, 7-chloroemodinal, and 7-chloroemodic acid. All species contain 7-chlorocatenarin and sometimes a smaller proportion of catenarin.

== Habitat and distribution ==
Catenarina is found in the southernmost regions of the Southern Hemisphere, including Antarctica, southern Patagonia, and Kerguelen Islands. The genus is adapted to habitats influenced by saline spray water and/or bird manure. The three species in the genus show a transition in habitat, from maritime rocks in Antarctica (C. iomma), to rocks near the sea or outcrops in Nothofagus forests and near the tree line (C. vivasiana). Catenarina desolata is found on rocks in the dry Patagonian steppe or in transitional grasslands adjacent to true steppes, as well as on volcanic inland rock on Kerguelen Island. In 2017 it was reported from James Ross Island in the Antarctic Peninsula. Despite its original description as a lichenicolous lichen, several collections from James Ross Island have a non-lichenicolous habit, and are mostly endolithic.

== Species ==
- Catenarina desolata Søchting, Søgaard & Elvebakk (2014)
- Catenarina iomma (Olech & Søchting) Søchting & Søgaard (2014)
- Catenarina vivasiana Søgaard & Søchting (2014)
