= Hepatotoxin =

Toxic chemical substance that damages the liver

A hepatotoxin (Gr., hepato = liver) is a toxic chemical substance that damages the liver.

It can be a side-effect, but hepatotoxins are also found naturally, such as microcystins and pyrrolizidine alkaloids, or in laboratory environments, such as carbon tetrachloride, far more pervasively in the form of ethanol (drinking alcohol), or common over-the-counter medications like paracetamol.

The effects of hepatotoxins depend on the amount, point of entry and distribution speed of the toxin, and on the health of the person.

Intrinsic hepatotoxins (type A) have a predictable, dose-dependent effect. Idiosyncratic (type B) hepatotoxic reactions are unpredictable, independent of dose, and appear to be determined by the individual exposed. Compounds that preferentially affect bile ducts are referred to as "cholestatic", one example being chlorpromazine. Those that target mostly the hepatocytes themselves are termed "hepatocellular", one example being paracetamol. "Mixed" toxicity, affecting both the bile ducts and hepatocytes, is not uncommon. Hepatocellular injury is clinically marked by a high ratio of ALT to ALP, and cholestatic injury by a lower ratio.

== Hepatotoxic substances ==
- α-amanitin, a deadly cellular toxin found in Amanita phalloides mushroom (death cap) - intrinsic
- Aflatoxin - intrinsic
- Ethanol - intrinsic
- Halothane - idiosyncratic
- Paracetamol - intrinsic
- Pyrrolizidine alkaloids, found in many plants in the Boraginaceae, Compositae, and Leguminosae families - intrinsic
- Luteoskyrin
- Kava (disputed) - idiosyncratic
- Allyl alcohol - intrinsic
- Allopurinol - idiosyncratic
- Amiodarone - idiosyncratic
- Aroclor 1254
- Arsenic - intrinsic
- Carbamazepine - idiosyncratic
- Carbon tetrachloride - intrinsic
- Chlorpromazine - idiosyncratic
- Cocaethylene
- Diclofenac - idiosyncratic
- Diethylnitrosamine
- Dimethylformamide
- Diquat
- Etoposide
- Indomethacin - idiosyncratic
- Inhalants
- Iproniazid (withdrawn) - idiosyncratic
- Methapyrilene
- Methotrexate
- 3-methylcholanthrene.
- All penicillins - idiosyncratic
- Sulfonamide antibiotics - idiosyncratic
- Tricyclic antidepressants - idiosyncratic

== See also ==
- Mycotoxins
- Hepatotoxicity
- Nephrotoxicity
- Neurotoxicity
- Ototoxicity
- Myelotoxicity
