= Catenarina desolata =

Scientific classification
- Domain: Eukaryota
- Kingdom: Fungi
- Division: Ascomycota
- Class: Lecanoromycetes
- Order: Teloschistales
- Family: Teloschistaceae
- Genus: Catenarina
- Species: C. desolata

Binomial name
- Catenarina desolata Søchting, Søgaard & Elvebakk (2014)

Species of lichen

Catenarina desolata is a species of lichen in the family Teloschistaceae. It was formally described as a new species in 2014 by lichenologists Ulrik Søchting, Majbrit Søgaard, and Arve Elvebakk. It is predominantly found in the southernmost parts of Chile, with some instances in Antarctica and the Kerguelen Islands. Characterised by its dark reddish-brown to almost purple apothecia, this species of lichen was originally thought to be lichenicolous, meaning it grows on other lichens, particularly Aspicilia species. The later discovery non-lichen-dwelling examples from James Ross Island in the Antarctic Peninsula suggests that it is not exclusively lichenicolous. Its distinctive secondary compound, 7-chlorocatenarin, sets it apart from other lichens in the region.

== Taxonomy ==
Catenarina desolata was first formally described by lichenologists Ulrik Søchting, Majbrit Søgaard, and Arve Elvebakk in a 2014 study. The species name, desolata, is derived from the term "desolate place of bad spirits" in the Tehuelche language, a reference to the Pali Aike region in Chile where it was first discovered. The type specimen was collected at Morro Chico in the Magallanes Region.

== Description ==
The thallus of Catenarina desolata is either inconspicuous or forms effuse, necrotic mauve patches on its host, usually on Aspicilia species. Its apothecia are numerous, deep red in colour, and contain mainly 7-chloroemodin and 7-chlorocatenarin. The species is easily distinguishable from other lichens by its unique apothecial colour, lack of thallus, and the high proportion of 7-chlorocatenarin.

=== Similar species ===
Catenarina desolata shares its chemistry with another Antarctic species, Caloplaca iomma, which has since been combined into Catenarina. Caloplaca iomma is distinguishable from Catenarina desolata by its deeper reddish-orange apothecia that eventually turn reddish-brown, greyish to beige apothecial margins, narrower spore septum, and coastal occurrence with seasonal streams of water.

== Habitat and distribution ==
Catenarina desolata is found primarily in southernmost Chile, in the XII Region of Magallanes, where it is abundant at known localities. It grows on white crustose Aspicilia species, which are found on volcanic and soft sedimentary rocks in the Patagonian steppe or in dry grassland bordering the steppe at elevations of 190–300 m (620–980 ft). Though the species is also found in the Kerguelen Islands and Antarctica, it is less conspicuous and not assumed to be common in these regions. In 2017, the lichen was reported from James Ross Island in the Antarctic Peninsula, where it is very common on volcanic, non-littoral rocks in the northern, non-glaciated part. Many of the specimens at that location are non-lichenicolous—most are endolithic, growing in the interior of rocks, under and around the rock crystals.
