= Tassiloa digitaurea =

Scientific classification
- Kingdom: Fungi
- Division: Ascomycota
- Class: Lecanoromycetes
- Order: Teloschistales
- Family: Teloschistaceae
- Genus: Tassiloa
- Species: T. digitaurea

Binomial name
- Tassiloa digitaurea (Søgaard, Søchting & Sancho) S.Y.Kondr., Kärnefelt, A.Thell, Elix, Jung Kim, A.S.Kondr. & Hur (2015)

Synonyms
- Caloplaca digitaurea Søgaard, Søchting & Sancho (2011)

Species of lichen

Tassiloa digitaurea is a species of lichen in the family Teloschistaceae. It was described from collections made in Chilean Patagonia in 2011 and is characterized by forming tiny, cushion-like tufts with bright orange, finger-like projections that earned it the vernacular name Goldfinger fire-dot lichen. The species was later moved to a new genus called Tassiloa based on molecular analysis that showed it was distinct from other similar lichens. It appears to be endemic to western Patagonia, where it grows on volcanic rock in windy shrublands and coastal grasslands.

== Taxonomy ==
Caloplaca digitaurea was described in 2011 by Majbrit Søgaard, Ulrik Søchting, and Sancho from material collected at the Cueva del Milodón Natural Monument, near Puerto Natales in Chilean Patagonia. Molecular data placed it close to the Sonoran Desert species C. wetmorei, but the two share only 93% sequence similarity and differ markedly in ecology and morphology: C. wetmorei is a parasite with tiny apothecia, whereas C. digitaurea is free-living and produces apothecial discs twice as large. The species epithet combines the Latin digitatus ('fingered') with aureus ('golden') and alludes to the vivid orange, finger-like lobules—hence the suggested English vernacular name "Goldfinger fire-dot lichen".

In a three-gene molecular analysis Sergey Kondratyuk and colleagues recovered C. digitaurea and C. wetmorei as a well-supported clade that sits in the Catenarina clade of subfamily Teloschistoideae. Because the pair share a distinctive microfruticose, isidiate thallus and parietin-based chemistry, the authors raised the group to genus level under the name Tassiloa, honouring the German lichenologist Tassilo Feuerer. They made two new combinations, Tassiloa digitaurea (chosen as the type species) and T. wetmorei, and diagnosed the genus by its orange, terete isidia-like lobules, zeorine to lecanorine apothecia with a paraplectenchymatous exciple, and anthraquinone profile.

== Description ==
The thallus forms minute, cushion-like tufts up to 2 mm tall, composed of mostly vertical, cylindrical lobules 60–100 micrometres (μm) thick and up to 1.5 mm long. These lobules resemble swollen isidia (tiny vegetative offshoots) and give the lichen a micro-shrubby appearance. Their surface is uneven and matt, coloured a brilliant orange-yellow that deepens in older parts. The internal photobiont partner is a Trebouxia-type green alga.

Apothecia (fruiting bodies) are scarce and nestle among the lobules. Young discs show a thin internal rim (a zeorine margin) the same colour as the disc and thallus, but with age this develops into a slightly raised, paler border that is often masked by overgrowing isidia. Mature apothecia measure 0.8–1.5 mm across; the disc is flat, deep orange and dusted with a medium-coarse episamma (granular coating). Internally the exciple is fan-shaped, narrowing from roughly 80 μm laterally to 20 μm at the base; the hymenium is 60–100 μm tall and threaded by branched paraphyses with slightly swollen tips. Eight ellipsoid spores develop per ascus; each is divided by a single narrow septum, measuring 13–16 × 6–7 μm. No pycnidia have been observed. Chemical analysis (HPLC) shows parietin as the dominant secondary metabolite, with traces of teloschistin, fallacinal, parietinic acid and emodin—an assemblage of compounds corresponding to chemosyndrome A of Søchting (1997).

== Habitat and distribution ==
The species is known only from the Magallanes Region of southern Chile, where it grows on sheltered but well-lit volcanic outcrops between 5 m and 170 m above sea level. It colonises basaltic rock, accumulated detritus and occasionally the surface of other lichens in wind-swept shrubland and coastal grassland, yet it is not truly maritime. Additional collections from Torres del Paine National Park and from Caleta Honde on Navarino Island suggest that T. digitaurea is a local endemic of western Patagonia, adapted to nutrient-rich, cool, humid habitats that are still under-explored lichenologically.
