= Aspergillus porosus =

Scientific classification
- Kingdom: Fungi
- Division: Ascomycota
- Class: Eurotiomycetes
- Order: Eurotiales
- Family: Aspergillaceae
- Genus: Aspergillus
- Species: A. porosus

Binomial name
- Aspergillus porosus A.J. Chen, J.C. Frisvad & R.A. Samson (2017)

Species of fungus

Aspergillus porosus is a species of fungus in the genus Aspergillus. It is from the Aspergillus section. The species was first described in 2017. It has been isolated from soil in Turkey and fruit in Israel. It has been reported to produce asperflavin, auroglaucin, bisanthrons, dihydroauroglaucin, echinulins, emodin, epiheveadrides, isoechinulins, flavoglaucin, neoechinulins, physcion, and tetrahydroauroglaucin.
