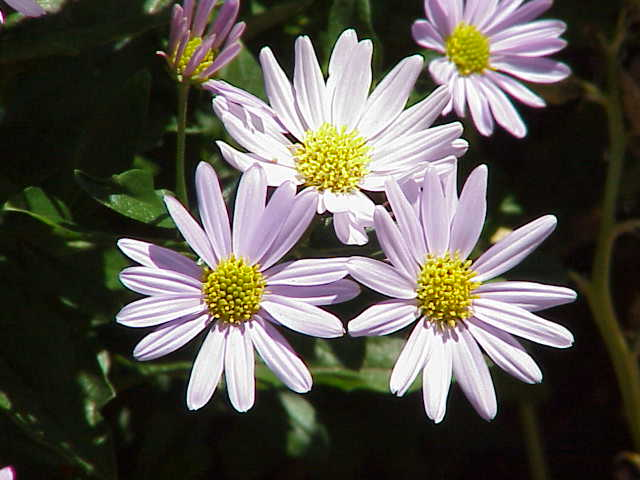
- Kalimeris incisa

Scientific classification
- Kingdom: Plantae
- Clade: Tracheophytes
- Clade: Angiosperms
- Clade: Eudicots
- Clade: Asterids
- Order: Asterales
- Family: Asteraceae
- Subfamily: Asteroideae
- Tribe: Astereae
- Subtribe: Asterinae
- Genus: Kalimeris (Cass.) Cass., 1825

Synonyms
- Aster subg. Kalimeris Cass.; Aster sect. Asteromoea (Blume) Makino; Boltonia sect. Asteromoea (Blume) Benth.; Asteromoea Blume; Aster sect. Kalimeris (Cass.) Nees ex O.Hoffm.; Calimeris Nees, alternate spelling

= Kalimeris =

Genus of flowering plants

Kalimeris (or the Kalimeris asters) is a genus of plants in the family Asteraceae.

It was first described in 1825 by the French botanist Alexandre Henri Gabriel de Cassini (1781-1832).

This genus occurs mainly in eastern Asia (China, Korea and Japan), but is also naturalised on Hawaii.

They can grow to a height of 1-1.5 m. The foliage is herbaceous. The blue-green leaves vary per species and are smooth textured. They can be long and narrow, round with large teeth or lobed. The flower heads are solitary or in leafy flat-topped inflorescences. The disc florets are yellow, the ray florets are white, pink or purple.

The chromosome base number is x = 9. The genus's closest relatives are found in the Asian members of Aster and Heteropappus.

Species

- Kalimeris altaica
- Kalimeris associata
- Kalimeris ciliosa
- Kalimeris coronata
- Kalimeris hispida
- Kalimeris incisa
- Kalimeris indica : Indian aster
- Kalimeris integrifolia
- Kalimeris lancifolia
- Kalimeris lautureana
- Kalimeris longipetiolata
- Kalimeris mongolica : Genghis Khan aster
- Kalimeris procera - China
- Kalimeris shimadae
- Kalimeris smithianus
- Kalimeris tatarica
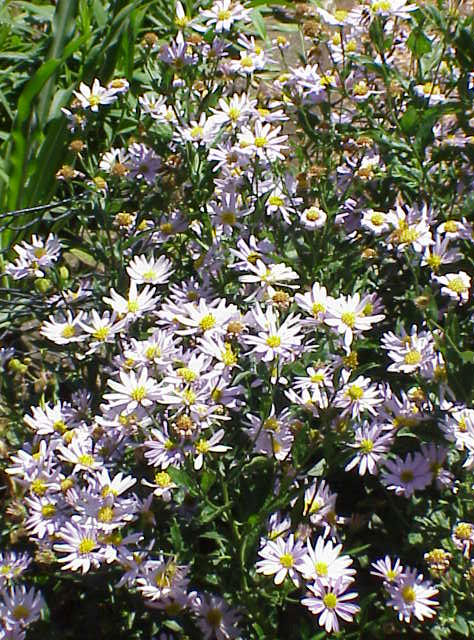
Kalimeris incisa - habit

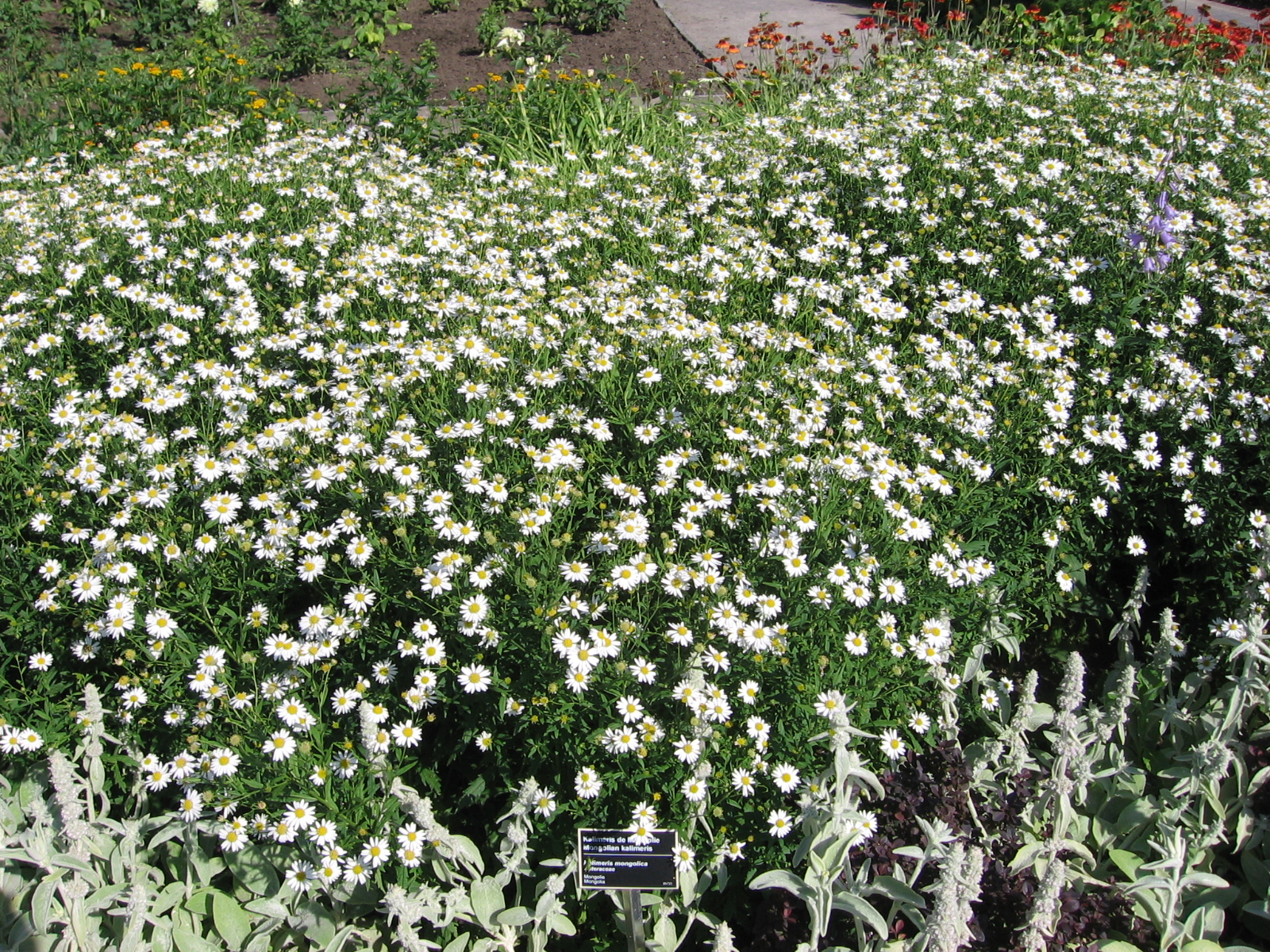
K. mongolica - habit
