= Cyclochlorotine =

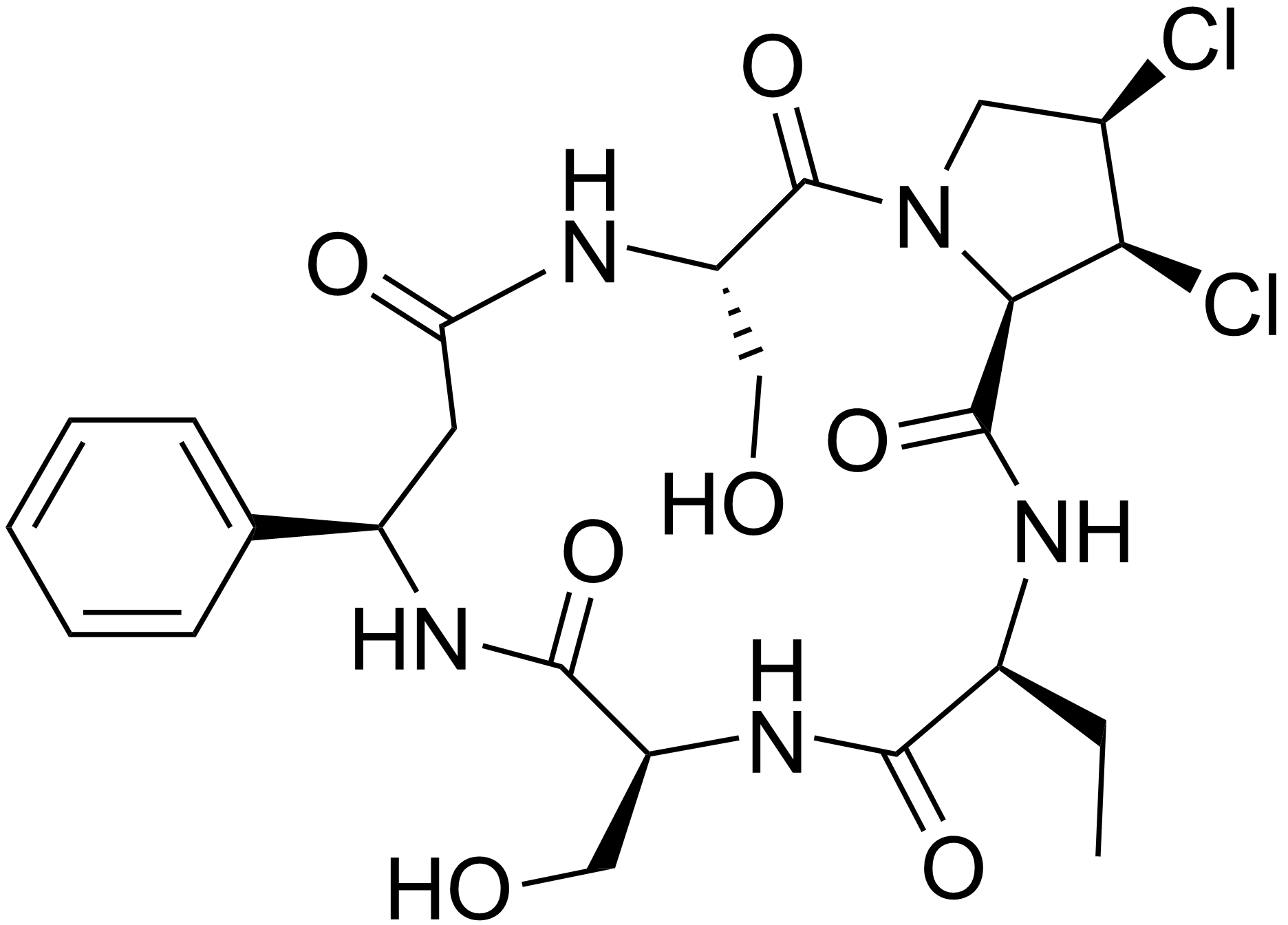

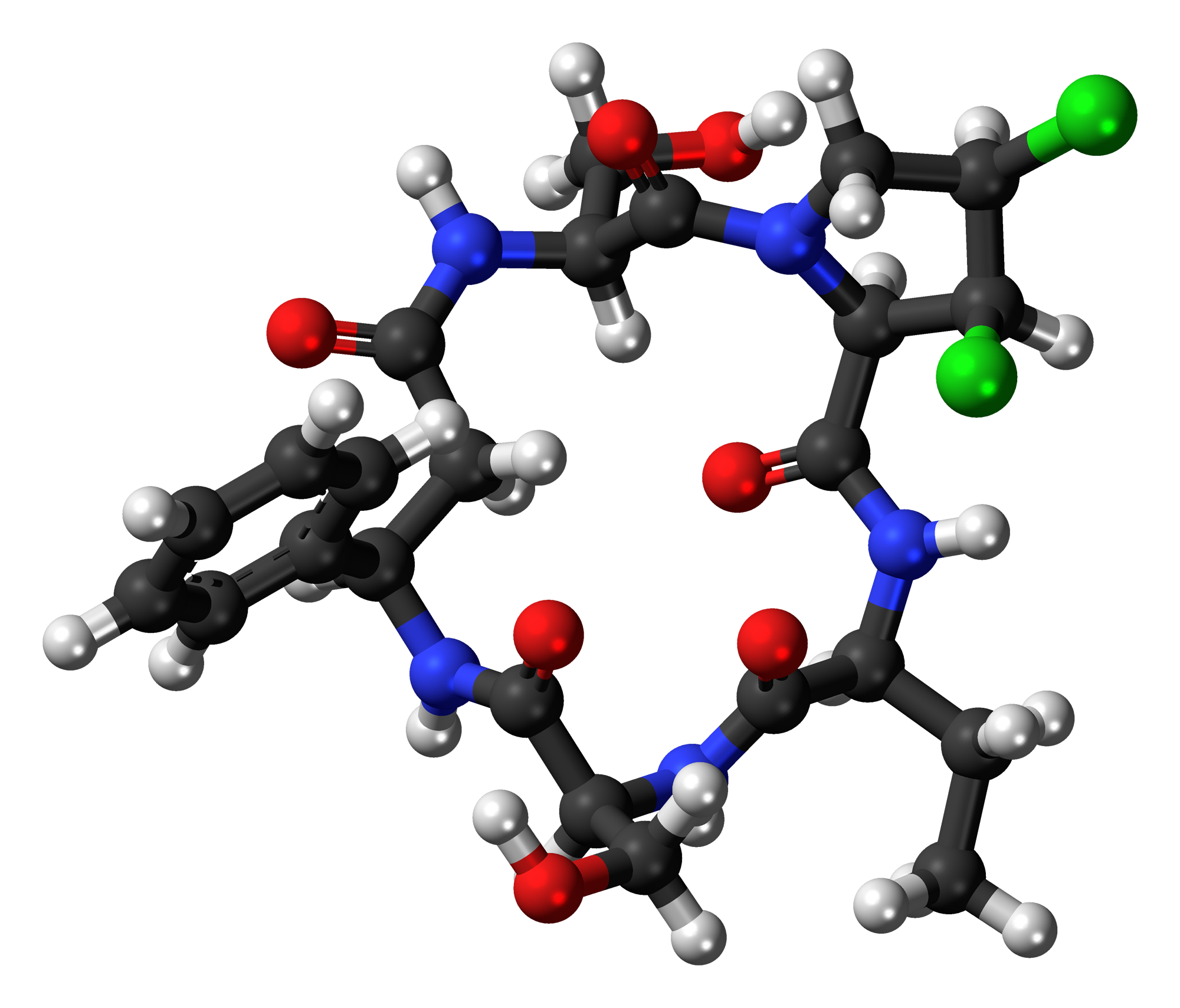

Names
- IUPAC name 1,2-Dichloro-15-ethyl-5,12-bis-hydroxymethyl-9-phenyl-dodecahydro-3a,6,10,13,16-pentaaza-cyclopentac yclohexadecene-4,7,11,14,17-pentaone
- Other names Cyclo[(R)-3-phenyl-β-alanyl-L-seryl-(2α,3α,4α)-3,4-dichloro-L-prolyl-L-2-aminobutanoyl-L-seryl]; Yellowed rice toxin

Identifiers
CAS Number	12663-46-6
3D model (JSmol)	Interactive image
ChemSpider	28426727
KEGG	C19379
PubChem CID	25565
UNII	B9GK4M718Q
CompTox Dashboard (EPA)	DTXSID1020356
- InChI: InChI=1S/C24H31Cl2N5O7/c1-2-14-21(35)30-16(10-32)22(36)29-15(12-6-4-3-5-7-12)8-18(34)27-17(11-33)24(38)31-9-13(25)19(26)20(31)23(37)28-14/h3-7,13-17,19-20,32-33H,2,8-11H2,1H3,(H,27,34)(H,28,37)(H,29,36)(H,30,35)/t13-,14+,15-,16+,17+,19-,20+/m1/s1 Key: PMBVHCCVEPYDSN-BADCMNFISA-N; InChI=1/C24H31Cl2N5O7/c1-2-14-21(35)30-16(10-32)22(36)29-15(12-6-4-3-5-7-12)8-18(34)27-17(11-33)24(38)31-9-13(25)19(26)20(31)23(37)28-14/h3-7,13-17,19-20,32-33H,2,8-11H2,1H3,(H,27,34)(H,28,37)(H,29,36)(H,30,35)/t13-,14+,15-,16+,17+,19-,20+/m1/s1 Key: PMBVHCCVEPYDSN-BADCMNFIBI
- SMILES: O=C([C@H](CO)NC1=O)N[C@@H](C2=CC=CC=C2)CC(N[C@H](C(N3[C@H](C(N[C@H]1CC)=O)[C@H](Cl)[C@H](Cl)C3)=O)CO)=O

Properties
Chemical formula	C_{24}H_{31}Cl_{2}N_{5}O_{7}
Molar mass	572.44 g·mol^{−1}
- Except where otherwise noted, data are given for materials in their standard state (at 25 °C [77 °F], 100 kPa). verify (what is ?) Infobox references

Cyclochlorotine (CC), also known as islanditoxin, is a mycotoxin produced by the fungus Penicillium islandicum that causes liver damage and has carcinogenic properties. Japanese researchers confirmed that it was one of three strains of Penicillin fungi responsible for yellowed rice. It is listed as an IARC Group 3 carcinogen.

Chemically, it is a dichlorinated cyclic peptide. Structurally, the only thing that differentiates cyclochlorotine from the plant-derived astins of Aster tataricus, is replacement of a serine with a second 2-aminobutyrate.

Cyclochlorotine is one of the toxins usually found in foods in grains such as rice, wheat, soybeans, peanuts, beans, bread, flour, etc. Such foods serve as medium for the growth of molds such as Penicillium islandicum which in turn release toxins such as cyclochlorotine. Research shows that that biosynthesis of cyclochlorotine is a multi-step mechanism and makes use of a vital component in the last step known as NRPS (CctN).
