= Pleuropterus =

Scientific classification
- Kingdom: Plantae
- Clade: Embryophytes
- Clade: Tracheophytes
- Clade: Angiosperms
- Clade: Eudicots
- Order: Caryophyllales
- Family: Polygonaceae
- Genus: Pleuropterus; Turcz.

Genus of flowering plants

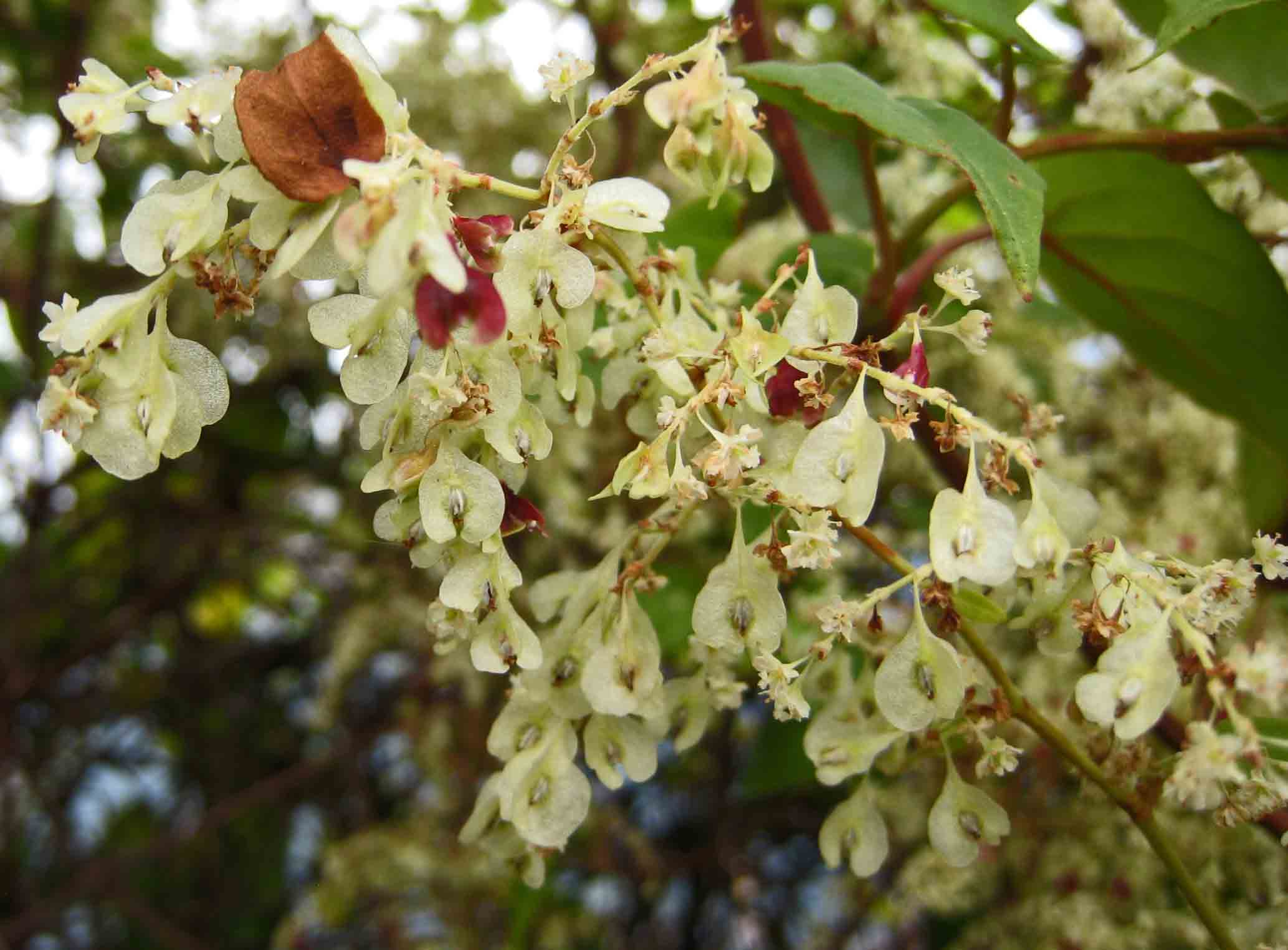
Pleuropterus multiflorus

Pleuropterus is a genus of flowering plants in the family Polygonaceae. It includes two species native to China, Taiwan, Thailand, and Vietnam.

- Pleuropterus angulatus (S.Y.Liu) B.Q.Xu & G.H.Wen
- Pleuropterus multiflorus (Thunb.) Turcz. ex Nakai
