= Catenarina vivasiana =

Scientific classification
- Domain: Eukaryota
- Kingdom: Fungi
- Division: Ascomycota
- Class: Lecanoromycetes
- Order: Teloschistales
- Family: Teloschistaceae
- Genus: Catenarina
- Species: C. vivasiana

Binomial name
- Catenarina vivasiana Søgaard & Søchting (2014)

Species of lichen

Catenarina vivasiana is a species of crustose lichen in the family Teloschistaceae. It is found in the southernmost regions of South America, predominantly in Chile. Characterised by its dark reddish-brown thallus and unique chemistry, this lichen is named in honour of Spanish lichenologist Mercedes Vivas. It was formally described as a new species in 2014.

== Taxonomy ==
Catenarina vivasiana was first described by Majbrit Søgaard and Ulrik Søchting in a 2014 study. The type specimen was collected by the first author in January 2008 in the XII Región de Magallanes y de la Antarctica Chilena, (Última Esperanza Province, Torres del Paine National Park, Chile); there, it was found growing on rocks amongst moss and plant detritus. The species epithet honours Spanish lichenologist Mercedes Vivas.

== Description ==
The thallus of Catenarina vivasiana is crustose, deep reddish-brown, and dispersed bullate to rarely continuous with irregular marginal lobes. The areoles are strongly convex to coralloid and up to 1 mm high, particularly when growing on detritus. The surface is rugulose, with or without a white epinecral layer. Apothecia are often absent, but when present, they are sessile, lecanorine to zeorine in form, and up to 0.5 mm in diameter. The species is distinguished by its secondary chemistry, containing mainly 7-chloroemodin and a small proportion of 7-chlorocatenarin.

== Habitat and distribution ==
Catenarina vivasiana is primarily found in light-exposed rock outcrops in lowland Nothofagus forests, both deciduous and evergreen types, between altitudes of 45 and 145 m (148 and 476 ft). It has also been found on maritime rocks in Navarino Island and rocks in low-andine heathland close to the tree line. This lichen can grow directly on rocks or on detritus among bryophytes, lichens, and cyanobacteria. As of its initial publication,Catenarina vivasiana is known only in the Chilean XII Region of Magallanes, in Provincia de Ultima Esperanza and Provincia de la Antarctica Chilena, Isla Navarino, but the authors suggest that its actual distribution may extend further north in South America.
