= Luteoskyrin =

Names
- IUPAC name 5,8,10,14,20,23,25,28-octahydroxy-6,21-dimethyloctacyclo[14.11.1.0^{2,11}.0^{2,15}.0^{4,9}.0^{13,17}.0^{17,26}.0^{19,24}]octacosa-4,6,8,10,19,21,23,25-octaene-3,12,18,27-tetrone
- Other names: (1.beta.,1′.beta.,3.beta.,3′.beta.)-8,8′-dihydroxy-rugulosin; 2,2′,4,4′,5,5′,8,8′-octahydroxy-2,2′,3,3′-tetrahydro-7,7′-dimethyl-1,1′-bianthraquinone; 8,8′-dihydroxy-rugulosin; 2,2′,3,3′-tetrahydro-2,2′,4,4′,5,5′,8,8′-octahydroxy-7,7′-dimethyl-(1,1′-bianthracene)-9,9′,10,10′-tetrone; flavomycelin

Identifiers
CAS Number	21884-44-6
3D model (JSmol)	Interactive image; natural: Interactive image
ChEBI	CHEBI:80711
ChEMBL	ChEMBL2003746
ChemSpider	28613; natural: 21781920
EC Number	244-631-1
KEGG	C16763
PubChem CID	30840
UNII	X3VHC7Q8G9
- InChI: InChI=1S/C30H22O12/c1-5-3-7(31)9-11(19(5)33)27(41)29-13-14-24(38)17(29)26(40)16-22(36)10-8(32)4-6(2)20(34)12(10)28(42)30(14,16)18(23(13)37)25(39)15(29)21(9)35/h3-4,13-14,17-18,23-24,31-38H,1-2H3; Key: FAZDYVMEXQHRLI-UHFFFAOYSA-N; natural: InChI=1S/C30H22O12/c1-5-3-7(31)9-11(19(5)33)27(41)29-13-14-24(38)17(29)26(40)16-22(36)10-8(32)4-6(2)20(34)12(10)28(42)30(14,16)18(23(13)37)25(39)15(29)21(9)35/h3-4,13-14,17-18,23-24,31-34,37-40H,1-2H3/t13-,14-,17+,18+,23-,24-,29+,30+/m1/s1 Key: KXNUPFFSGSRABD-TZRHFUAUSA-N
- SMILES: Cc1cc(c2c(c1O)C(=O)C34C5C6C(C3C(=O)C7=C(c8c(cc(c(c8C(=O)C67C(C5O)C(=O)C4=C2O)O)C)O)O)O)O; natural: Cc1cc(c2c(c1O)C(=O)[C@]34[C@@H]5[C@@H]6[C@H]([C@H]3C(=C7[C@@]6([C@@H]([C@@H]5O)C(=C4C2=O)O)C(=O)c8c(c(cc(c8O)C)O)C7=O)O)O)O

Properties
Chemical formula	C_{30}H_{22}O_{12}
Molar mass	574.494 g·mol^{−1}
Appearance	Yellow rectangular crystals
Density	2.03 g/cm^{3}
Melting point	287 °C (549 °F; 560 K)
Boiling point	979.7–1,118.1 °C (1,795.5–2,044.6 °F; 1,252.8–1,391.2 K)

Hazards
- Occupational safety and health (OHS/OSH)
Main hazards	Toxic to aquatic life with long-lasting effects, harmful if swallowed.
- GHS labelling
Hazard statements	H302, H410
Precautionary statements	P264, P270, P273, P301+P312, P330, P391, P501
- Except where otherwise noted, data are given for materials in their standard state (at 25 °C [77 °F], 100 kPa).

Luteoskyrin is a carcinogenic mycotoxin with the molecular formula C_{30}H_{22}O_{12} which is produced by the mold Penicillium islandicum. Luteoskyrin has strong cytotoxic effects. Luteoskyrin can cause the yellow rice disease.

== History ==
The mold Talaromyces (Penicillium) islandicus was discovered in the Japanese South Sea Islands after World War II. At that time, the country was facing a crisis and relied on imported food from countries such as Egypt. Around the 1950s, the Japanese government started health inspections and realized that some of the rice was yellow. Fungal isolation experiments were performed from which T. islandicus was identified as a key agent. Further experiments lead to the discovery of a yellow, crystalline pigment which they named luteoskyrin. Mold contaminated rice was then discovered to produce liver cirrhosis and liver tumours in rats, a condition named "Yellow Rice Syndrome".

== Biosynthesis ==
(–)-luteoskyrin can be synthesized by first isolating catenarin from Penicillium islandicum NRLL 1036. Catenarin is then reduced to 3,5,8,9,10-pentahydroxy-6-methyl-3,4-dihydroanthracen-1(2H)-one via a chemoenzymatic sequence catalyzed by NADPH-dependent anthrol reductase (ARti). Further oxidation yields a key intermediate, (R)-dihydrocatenarin, which undergoes further non-enzymatic autooxidation under aerobic conditions and generates radical species. Those couple via C−C bond formation to produce a dimeric intermediate which eventually cyclizes into (–)-rubroskyrin via C−C bond formation coupling reactions. (–)-rubroskyrin finally converts to (–)-luteoskyrin via a base-catalyzed Michael addition.

== Chemical And Physical Properties ==
=== Reactivity ===
Luteoskyrin is poorly soluble in most organic compounds and mildly alkaline conditions. In more alkaline environment (pH>12) however, it is almost fully deprotonated and subsequently very soluble.

=== Solubility ===
Under strongly basic conditions luteoskyrin is very unstable. It exhibits great susceptibility to light and chemical degradation. Highly concentrated solutions in DMSO lead to decomposition even in the absence of light, at room temperature. The compound is particularly photosensitive in acetone.

== Detection Methods ==
Conventionally, luteoskyrin can be determined via thin-layer chromatography with Silica gel G in an isopropanol/ammonium hydroxide mixture, but not with great sensitivity and extensive detection limits. Alternatively, liquid chromatography-tandem mass spectrometry (LC-MS-MS) with electrospray ionization has been shown to provide highly sensitive results with minor clean-up required.

== Availability, Use And Exposure ==
=== Availability ===
Luteoskyrin occurs in food. It is known to be a storage mold contaminant of rice or cereals that appears under high humidity conditions.

=== Use ===
This compound is currently being used as a tool in scientific research, specially to study liver toxicity, and to investigate antibacterial and antifungal activity and perform mycotoxin analyses.

=== Exposure ===
The main exposure route is via oral ingestion, however in research settings luteoskyrin has been supplied through subcutaneous injection, intravenous injection, and oral administration.

== ADME ==
=== Absorption ===
Luteoskyrin is a lipophilic bis-anthraquinone that, if ingested, is absorbed through the gastrointestinal tract via passive diffusion. It travels via the portal vein directly into the liver.

=== Distribution ===
It highly accumulated at the mitochondria and endoplasmic reticulum of liver cells (max accumulation within a day) and minor distribution to the serum and kidneys. Studies have reported accumulation after several days after exposure and sex differences in the half-life of this compound.

=== Metabolism ===
It undergoes hepatic biotransformation, where it is reduced to semiquinone radicals by NADPH-dependent cytochrome reductases.

=== Excretion ===
The main routes of excretion are biliary and fecal. Small amounts are processed by the liver and excreted through bile into feces, while a minor fraction is processed by kidneys and excreted in urine. However, the clearance rate is low due to protein/DNA binding, which prolongs exposure and leads to chronic liver injury.

== Molecular Mechanism of Action ==
Luteoskyrin accumulates selectively in the liver. The liver contains high levels of mitochondria and cytochrome p450 reductase, driving redox cycling. Its main toxicity mechanism involves redox cycling and ROS generation. Redox cycling is stimulated by the many quinone groups in luteoskyrin. When luteoskyrin is reduced, it can react with oxygen because the quinone groups will undergo one-electron redox cycling. The reactive oxygen species that are being formed result in hydroxyl radicals (•OH). The production of oxidative species such as superoxide and hydroxyl radicals is a major driver for oxidative stress.

Hydroxyl radicals initiate an induction of lipid peroxidation of fatty acids in cell membranes. The radical takes a hydrogen atom from a membrane lipid (LH). A lipid radical (L•) is now formed, which will react with oxygen to a lipid peroxyl radical (LOO•). This lipid peroxyl radical is then able to attack new membrane lipids, leading to a loss of membrane integrity and leakage of transaminases. Also, by damaging mitochondrial membranes, ROS is even further stimulated, because of electron leakage. However, ROS can also attack guanine in the DNA, where it mismatches with adenine leading to guanine to a thymine transversion. A change in toxicity is indicated by an increase in 8-hydroxy-deoxyguanosine (8-OHdG), a marker for hydroxy radical mediated modification of DNA guanine residues. It thus indicates that the hydroxy radicals are attacking DNA and oxidatively damaging it. ROS-mediated oxidative DNA damage contributes to mutagenicity and carcinogenicity.

Furthermore, because luteoskyrin is an aromatic, planar molecule, it can intercalate into DNA where it is able to bind to cellular macromolecules such as proteins and nucleic acids. By binding these macromolecules, luteoskyrin inhibits DNA/RNA synthesis, contributing to genotoxicity.

== Toxicology Data ==
Luteoskyrin has been found to be hepatoxic; itcauses oxidative stress, cellular damage and necrosis, impaired mitochondrial function and liver injury. The lethal toxicity is higher in male mice compared to female mice, since luteoskyrin accumulates in the liver at a much higher rate in males.

Luteoskyrin is also able to modify DNA and therefore classified as a group 3 carcinogen in mice by the IARC.

== Risk Management And Regulations ==
No regulations or definite limits have been set in any country to govern all important mycotoxins in foods, including luteoskyrin. It has been reported that certain phenolic antioxidants with antifungal properties suppress the growth of P. islandicum and consequently the production of luteoskyrin in rice. However, effective concentrations could exceed the legal limit, and the antioxidant activity relies on food composition. Further research is needed to validate the efficacy of those compounds in the food preservation industry.
