= Catenarina iomma =

Scientific classification
- Domain: Eukaryota
- Kingdom: Fungi
- Division: Ascomycota
- Class: Lecanoromycetes
- Order: Teloschistales
- Family: Teloschistaceae
- Genus: Catenarina
- Species: C. iomma

Binomial name
- Catenarina iomma (Olech & Søchting) Søchting & Søgaard (2014)

Synonyms
- Caloplaca iomma Olech & Søchting (1993)

Species of lichen

Catenarina iomma is a species of saxicolous (rock-dwelling), crustose lichen in the family Teloschistaceae. This Antarctic lichen was formally described as a new species in 1993 by Maria Olech and Ulrik Søchting; they initially classified it in Caloplaca. The type specimen was collected by the first author from the Admiralty Bay/Bransfield Strait junction, King George Island (South Shetland Islands), where it was found growing on beach rocks. The species epithet, which combines the Ancient Greek ios and omma, means "rusty eye", alluding to the orange apothecia (fruiting bodies) that are characteristic of this species. Søchting and Majbrit Søgaard transferred the taxon to the newly proposed Catenarina in 2014, a genus characterised its predominant secondary metabolite, catenarin.
