= Yellowed rice =

Rice contaminated with Penicillium fungi

Yellowed rice (also yellow rice, 黄変米 Ouhenmai Japanese: 黄変米, romanized: Ouhenmai) refers to three kinds of rice grains contaminated with different strains of Penicillium fungi—Yellow rice (P. citreonigrum), Citrinum yellow rice (P. citrinum), and Islandia yellow rice (P. islandicum). These rice grains were first identified in Japan in 1964, after the research was interrupted by World War II. The first of the yellowed rice strains has been linked to shoshin-kakke (heart-attacking paralysis). Citrinum yellow rice and Islandia yellow rice are not known to have caused any adverse effects in human populations.

== Discovery ==
=== Yellow rice (P. citreonigrum) ===
In 1891, Junjiro Sakaki began studying molded rice and inferred that mycotoxins contained in the rice were linked to paralysis. In 1937, the research was taken over by the Rice Utilization Institute. Although research was interrupted by World War II, it was resumed afterward and in 1964 the mycotoxin citreoviridin was isolated. Kenji Uraguchi at The University of Tokyo then used the isolated compound to induce heart-attack paralysis in laboratory animals.

=== Islandia yellow rice (P. islandicum) ===
In the aftermath of World War II, Japan was forced to import approximately 1 million pounds of rice from various countries. A large portion of this was from Egypt, in which a new form of yellow rice was discovered. This led to a team of six researchers—Yoshito Kobayashi, K. Uraguchi, Masashi Miyake, Mamoru Saito, Takashi Tatsuno, and Makoto Enomoto—to pool resources in order to study this new type of yellow rice. After seven months, they discovered the presence of two different mycotoxins, one with a distinct yellow pigment, the other colorless and odorless.

Chemical structure of mycotoxin luteoskyrin

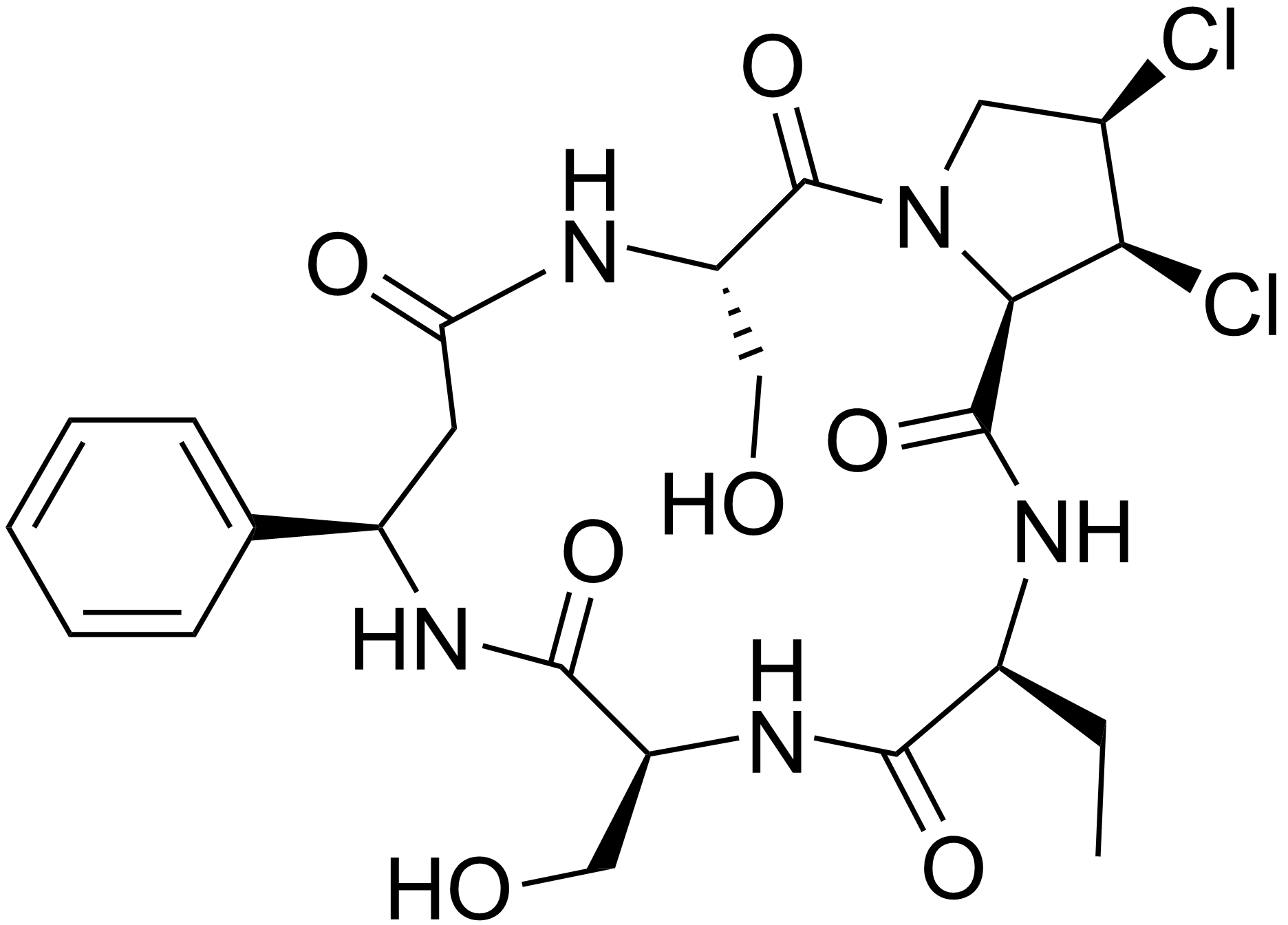
Chemical structure of mycotoxin cyclochlorotine

The first mycotoxin was researched further by Tatsuno and Shoji Shibata at the University of Tokyo and was eventually named luteoskyrin. The second toxin was much more difficult to assess, given its scarcity in comparison to luteoskyrin in the rice samples. Both Tatsuno and Shingo Marumo of Nagoya University proposed chemical structures for this elusive mycotoxin and upon further discussion, it was found that the two researchers had, in fact, discovered the same compound and subsequently named it cyclochlorotine (islanditoxin).

=== Citrinum yellow rice (P. citrinum) ===
Hiroshi Tsunoda discovered a third strain of yellow rice in 1951 and by 1954 had identified it in rice from China, Vietnam, Burma, Iran, Spain, America, Colombia, Ecuador, Peru and Japan. The mycotoxin that infected the rice was isolated from Penicillium citrinum and was found to be a secondary metabolite called citrinin. According to Tsunoda, P. citrinum was the most common fungi of the Penicillium species found in imported rice, with 20% of imports being contaminated.

== Impact ==
=== Yellow rice (P. citreonigrum) ===
Mycotoxins in rice was not an unknown problem in Japan before the discovery of Penicillium. Several mycotoxins had already been discovered, but these were grains that infected rice in the field rather than after harvest, such as citreonigrum. The discovery of mycotoxins in rice led to the reinforcement of rice hygiene standards. This led to a drastic decrease in shoshin-kakke cases in Japan in the early 20th century. Initially, this decrease was thought to be the discovery of vitamins, but vitamins were not introduced completely into the medical community until ten years after the fact.

=== Islandia yellow rice (P. islandicum) ===
In order to test the effects of the Islandia Yellow Rice, a study was conducted at the University of Tokyo by the researchers Kobayashi, Uraguchi, Miyake, Saito, Tatsuno, and Enomoto. These six researchers found that upon long-term ingestion of rice tainted with the mycotoxins luteoskyrin and cyclochlorotine, laboratory rats suffered from acute liver necrosis and tumorigenic effects due to the luteoskyrin, fibrosis and cirrhosis from the cyclochlorotine.

Chemical structure of mycotoxin citrinin

=== Citrinum yellow rice (P. citrinum) ===
Due to the high rates of citrinin found in rice, it was recommended to the Japanese government by the National Institute of Health of Japan that grain with greater that 1% contamination of P. citrinum should not be sold. There is no current worldwide legislation or guidelines on how much citrinin is allowed to be in grains due to its instability in foodstuffs. The lack of regulation of citrinin may also be due to the fact that while studies have shown that it does act as a nephrotoxic and hepatotoxic agent, it is less toxic than other mycotoxins such as aflatoxin and ochratoxin. Citrinin does, however, have deleterious effects on the kidneys and is thought to be one of the culprits involved in the Balkan endemic nephropathy. Despite the lack of regulations, there have been various studies on how to reduce the growth of citrinin producing fungi and the subsequent production of citrinin. These studies have mainly focused on the thermal decontamination and detoxification of citrinin and the effects of herbs and spices on toxicity. While thermal detoxification has shown promising results (heating citrinin with water at 130 °C can significantly decrease its effects), heating it too much can actually stimulate the production of more toxin chemicals. Spices, on the other hand, have been used for most of human civilization as antimicrobial agents. This has led to several studies investigating whether spices and herbs can affect mycotoxins such as citrinin. One study has revealed that in the presence of Mentha arvensis (mint) extract, citrinin production was inhibited by 73%. Clove has also been studied for its antimicrobial properties. In a 2013 study, a clove solution was shown to decrease citrinin production by approximately 60%. Not all spices and herbs have had this effect on citrinin production. Piper betle (betel) extract was actually shown to stimulate citrinin production in some samples.

== Overview ==
Despite the lack of international regulation on mycotoxins in rice, the contamination scare following World War II did influence Japan's food safety guidelines. The discovery of P. citreonigrum led to the strengthening of rice hygiene standards by the Rice Utilization Institute, which later became the Food Control Bureau Institute. The collaborative investigations that followed the discoveries of each of the three yellow rice strains resulted in the founding of the Japanese Association for Mycotoxicology in 1973. Due to these extensive efforts by researchers, no human deaths have been reported as a result of Islandia Yellow Rice or Citrinum Yellow Rice.
