= Thielavia subthermophila =

Scientific classification
- Kingdom: Fungi
- Division: Ascomycota
- Class: Sordariomycetes
- Order: Sordariales
- Family: Chaetomiaceae
- Genus: Thielavia
- Species: T. subthermophila

Binomial name
- Thielavia subthermophila Mouch. (1973)

Species of fungus

Thielavia subthermophila is a ubiquitous, filamentous fungus that is a member of the phylum Ascomycota and order Sordariales. Known to be found on plants of arid environments, it is an endophyte with thermophilic properties, and possesses dense, pigmented mycelium. Thielavia subthermophila has rarely been identified as a human pathogen, with a small number of clinical cases including ocular and brain infections. For treatment, antifungal drugs such as amphotericin B have been used topically or intravenously, depending upon the condition.

== History ==
Thielavia subthermophila is a cleistothecial fungus that have a thin peridium, spherical ascoma, and dark-coloured ascospores. It was first described by Jean Mouchacca in 1973 who isolated it from desert soil. To date, there has been confusion in classifying species within the genus Thielavia, as the characteristics of the species are not well-differentiated from perithecial relatives in the genus Chaetomium.

== Morphology ==
Thielavia subthermophila forms grey colonies with a black reverse, with dark brown, hairy, spherical ascomata that are 90–200 μm in diameter and develop within the mycelial mat. The wall of the ascomata is made of textura epidermoidea or flattened and irregularly outlined cells measuring 6–8 μm in diameter, and is covered with dark, branching hyphae. Aleuriospores and chlamydospores are light brown, single-celled, 5–7 × 3–5 μm in diameter, have a truncate base, and grow terminally and laterally on short branches or hyphae. Thielavia subthermophila has asci measuring 20–30 × 15–22.5 μm in diameter, each containing 8 spores. It has single-celled, dark olive to black, fusiform or elliptical ascospores measuring 14–20 × 8–10 μm in diameter with a subapical germ pore measuring 1–1.5 μm in diameter. Compared to other species within the genus Thielavia such as Thielavia arenaria and Thielavia microspora, it is known to produce large ascospores. A felt-like aerial mycelium is characteristic of T. subthermophila, consisting of septate, branched, and hyaline or dark olive hyphae and measuring 1–3 μm.

== Growth ==
Thielavia subthermophila shows optimal growth and survival up to 36–45 °C (97–113 °F), as determined by its thermotolerant properties, and possesses light-protection structures. The asexual reproductive form of Thielavia subthermophila is associated with production of pale yellowish brown, smooth aleurioconidia measuring 3–4 × 2.5–3 μm in diameter, with no conidiophores present. Sexual reproduction is associated with abundant production of cleistothecia that are brownish black to black, scattered, and 120–180 μm in diameter, covered by dark olive hairs.

== Ecology ==
Thielavia subthermophila has been isolated from a wide range of environments, such as soil, camel hair, and desert vegetation. In addition, it has been found in dried Hibiscus flower, Brazilian pepper seeds, and species of herbal plants such as "Plantaginis herba", "Plantaginis semen", and Abies webbiana. Notably, T. subthermophila has been isolated as an endophyte of Hypericum perforatum, otherwise known as St. John's wort.

== Metabolites ==
Emodin is a fungal metabolite that has been isolated from Thielavia subthermophila, which inhibits the expression of cytokines, chemokines, and inflammatory modulators in vitro. Hypericin is a fungal metabolite that has also been isolated from Thielavia subthermophila, that initiates high cytotoxicity when excited by irradiation with visible light. Thielavia subthermophila isolated from the stems of Hypercium perforatum has been recognized to undergo mechanisms of emodin and hypericin biosynthesis.

== Pathology ==
As with other Thielavia species, Thielavia subthermophila has rarely been identified to be involved in human fungal infections.

=== Keratitis ===
Thielavia subthermophila has been recognized to cause ocular infections in humans, as it has been isolated from corneal scrapings of an infected patient, characterized by lesions with central ulceration and ill-defined margins.

=== Cerebral phaeohyphomycosis ===
Thielavia subthermophila has been known to cause fatal brain infections in humans, with the first case reported in an immunocompetent, Indian male. In the brain, its growth is known to be associated with fungal granulomas centered around blood vessels and branched fungal hyphae in the parenchyma. Cerebral phaeohyphomycosis due to Thielavia subthermophila is characterized by the production of pus and necrotic tissue in the brain. Symptoms of cerebral phaeohyphomycosis include foaming at the mouth, fever, seizures, involuntary urination, and uncontrolled movement of eyes and limbs.

== Treatment ==
To treat ocular infections, antifungal medication such as oral voriconazole and amphotericin B eyedrops can be administered to the patient. Fortified tobramycin, fortified cefazolin, fluorometholone, and scopolamine eyedrops can also be administered if necessary, depending on the symptoms. In addition, corneal abrasion can be performed on the patient to facilitate penetration of the antifungal medication. Amphotericin B therapy, surgical removal of infected tissue, and immune enhancement can be used to treat cerebral phaeohyphomycosis by Thielavia subthermophila, although despite treatment, is associated with high mortality. Currently, there is no accepted standard treatment for brain infections by T. subthermophila.
