= Penicillium islandicum =

Scientific classification
- Kingdom: Fungi
- Division: Ascomycota
- Class: Eurotiomycetes
- Order: Eurotiales
- Family: Aspergillaceae
- Genus: Penicillium
- Species: P. islandicum

Binomial name
- Penicillium islandicum Sopp, O.J. 1912

Type strain
- ATCC 10127, B 51913, BCRC 31560, CBS 338.48, CCRC 31560, CECT 2762, FRR 1036, IFO 6963, IHEM 3834, IMI 040042, IMI 040042ii, KCTC 6405, MUCL 31324, NBRC 6963, NI 6295, NRRL 1036, Putterill PP-54-K-1746, QM 7571, Thom 4658.144, Thom 4658.144.2, Thom 4658.35.144.2, UAMH 9542

Synonyms
- Talaromyces islandicus, Penicillium cirrhohepatis, Penicillium aurantioflammiferum

Species of fungus

Penicillium islandicum is an anamorph species of the genus of Penicillium which produces luteoskyrin, simatoxin, cyclochlorotine (islanditoxin), rugulosin and chitosanase.
