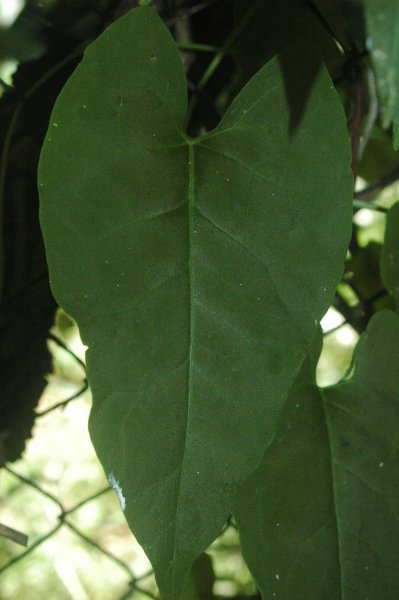
- Leaf
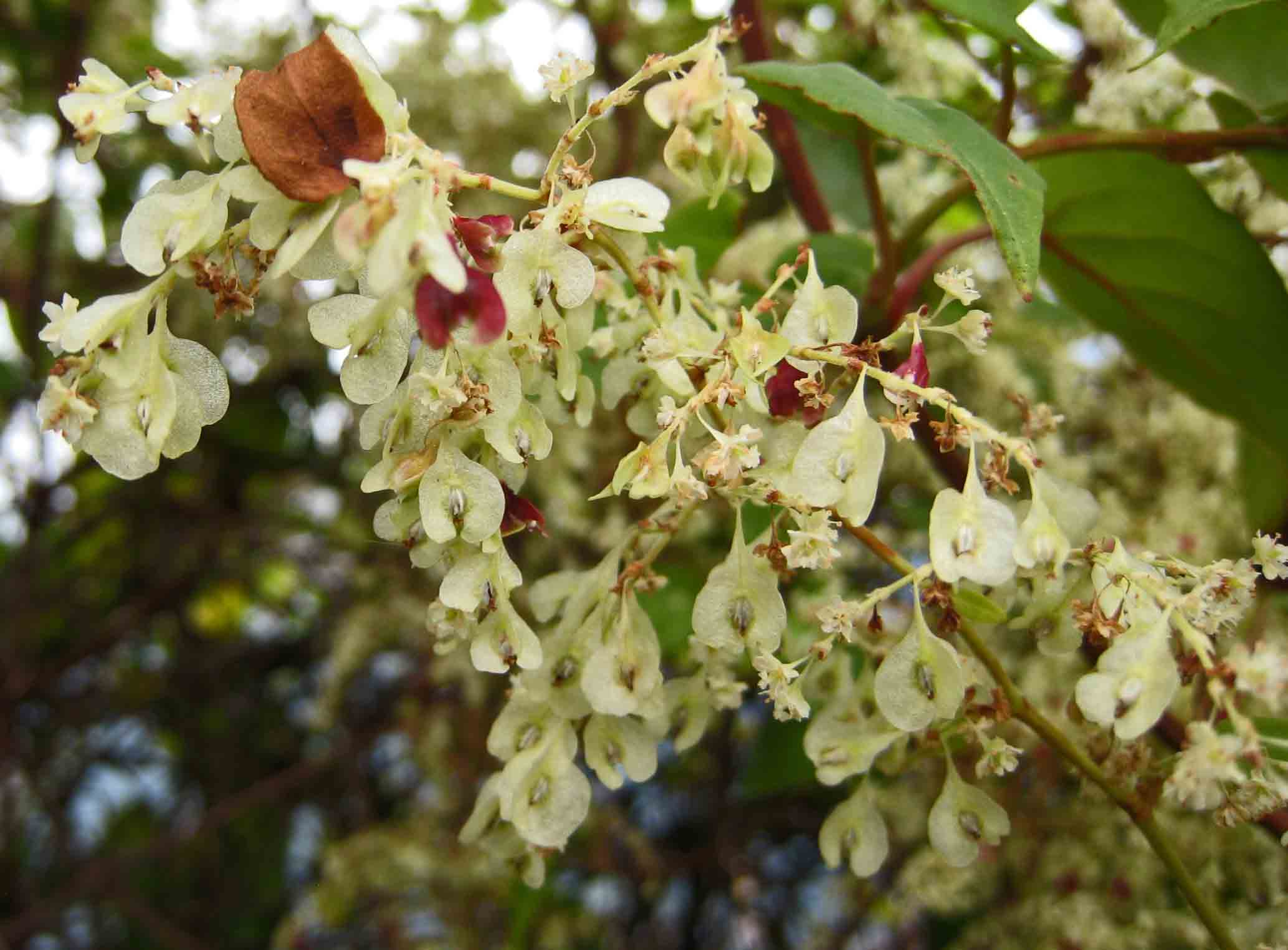
- Fruits

Scientific classification
- Kingdom: Plantae
- Clade: Tracheophytes
- Clade: Angiosperms
- Clade: Eudicots
- Order: Caryophyllales
- Family: Polygonaceae
- Genus: Pleuropterus
- Species: P. multiflorus

Binomial name
- Pleuropterus multiflorus (Thunb.) Turcz. ex Nakai

Synonyms
- Synonymy: Aconogonon hypoleucum (Ohwi) Soják; Bilderdykia multiflora (Thunb.) Roberty & Vautier; Fagopyrum multiflorum (Thunb.) Grinţ.; Fallopia multiflora (Thunb.) Haraldson; Fallopia multiflora var. hypoleuca (Ohwi) Yonek. & H.Ohashi; Helxine multiflorum (Thunb.) Raf.; Pleuropterus cordatus Turcz.; Pleuropterus hypoleucus Nakai; Polygonum chinense Houtt.; Polygonum hypoleucum (Nakai) Kudô & Sasaki; Polygonum hypoleucum Ohwi; Polygonum multiflorum Thunb. (basionym); Polygonum multiflorum var. hypoleucum (Ohwi) T.S.Liu, S.S.Ying & M.J.Lai; Reynoutria multiflora (Thunb.) Moldenke; Reynoutria multiflora var. hypoleuca (Ohwi) S.S.Ying

= Pleuropterus multiflorus =

Species of flowering plant

Pleuropterus multiflorus (syns. Fallopia multiflora, Polygonum multiflorum, and Reynoutria multiflora) is a species of flowering plant in the buckwheat family Polygonaceae native to central and southern China, Hainan, Taiwan, Vietnam, and Thailand. It is known by the English common names tuber fleeceflower and Chinese (climbing) knotweed. It is known as he shou wu (何首烏) in China and East Asia. Another name for the species is fo-ti, which is a misnomer.

It can be difficult to prevent the spread of this vine and to remove it once established. The leaves are thin and fragile but the stems, although narrow in diameter, can be very strong.

== Description ==
Pleuropterus multiflorus is a herbaceous perennial vine growing to 2–4 m (6 ft 7 in – 13 ft 1 in) tall from a woody tuber. The leaves are 3–7 cm (1.2–2.8 in) long and 2–5 cm (0.79–1.97 in) broad, broad arrowhead-shaped, with an entire margin. The flowers are 6–7 mm (0.24–0.28 in) diameter, white or greenish-white, produced on short, dense panicles up to 10–20 cm (3.9–7.9 in) long in summer to mid-autumn. The fruit is an achene 2.5–3 mm (0.098–0.118 in) long.

== In folk belief ==
In Chinese folklore, it is believed that the root of he shou wu (何首烏, Pleuropterus multiflorus) can, after a thousand years, transform into a human form, either as a child or an old person. It is also said that Zhang Guolao, one of the Eight Immortals, achieved immortality by consuming the essence of he shou wu.

Two types of stories often revolve around the essence of he shou wu. In one version, a monk or Taoist acquires a human-shaped he shou wu and instructs a disciple to cook it. The disciple, tempted, secretly tastes it, becomes immortal, and disappears. In the other version, the essence of he shou wu takes on human form and accompanies a woman. Finding his behavior suspicious, the woman sews a thread into him. The following day, she traces the thread and finds it attached to a he shou wu root, from which a human shape is growing.

== Traditional medicine ==
Pleuropterus multiflorus is listed in the Chinese Pharmacopoeia and is one of the most popular perennial traditional Chinese medicines. Caution must be taken, however, as overconsumption can lead to toxicity-induced hepatitis.

=== Chemistry ===
More than 100 chemical compounds have been isolated from Pleuropterus multiflorus, and the major components have been determined to be stilbenes, quinones, flavonoids, and others. Its extract contains a stilbene glycoside.

== See also ==
- Japanese knotweed
