= Villophora =

Scientific classification
- Kingdom: Fungi
- Division: Ascomycota
- Class: Lecanoromycetes
- Order: Teloschistales
- Family: Teloschistaceae
- Genus: Villophora; Søchting, Arup & Frödén (2013)

Type species
- Villophora isidioclada (Zahlbr.) Søchting, Frödén & Arup (2013)

Synonyms
- Raesaeneniana S.Y.Kondr., Kärnefelt, A.Thell, Elix & Hur (2015); Tayloriella S.Y.Kondr., Kärnefelt, A.Thell, Elix & Hur (2015)

Genus of lichens

Villophora is a genus of lichen-forming fungi in the subfamily Teloschistoideae of the family Teloschistaceae. Eight species are accepted in the genus. First circumscribed in 2013 and confirmed by a 2021 DNA study, the genus forms a well-supported branch of the Teloschistaceae alongside Josefpoeltia and the better-known Teloschistes. Villophora species make tiny crust-like to thread-like growths coloured by orange anthraquinone pigments and spread mainly by clouds of powdery reproductive granules. They occupy windswept Southern Hemisphere habitats from Patagonia to the Antarctic Peninsula, living on rock, bark or decaying wood in some of the coldest lichen environments on Earth.

== Taxonomy ==
Villophora was circumscribed in 2013, when Ulrik Søchting, Ulf Arup and Patrik Frödén overhauled the Teloschistaceae. The generic name Villophora means "carrying filaments". They placed the new genus—typified by the Chilean crustose lichen V. isidioclada—in their freshly erected subfamily Teloschistoideae, a Southern-Hemisphere lineage that also contains Teloschistes and Josefpoeltia. Although DNA data show these three genera to form one branch, the authors kept Villophora separate because its small, crusty to thread-like thalli and abundant powdery propagules (isidia, blastidia or soredia) are immediately distinguishable from the fruticose Teloschistes and the foliose Josefpoeltia, and they considered that lumping them would blur readily observed differences.

A multi-gene study in 2021 confirmed that Villophora is monophyletic and greatly broadened its circumscription. The analysis described six Southern-Hemisphere species—five new (V. darwiniana, V. onas, V. patagonica, V. rimicola and V. wallaceana) plus V. maulensis transferred from Raesaeneniana—and showed that the minute lichen formerly known as Tayloriellina microphyllina also nests inside Villophora. These additions emphasised the genus’s centre of diversity in Patagonia, Tierra del Fuego and Antarctica, where its species occur on rock, bark, decaying wood and even other lichens. Subsequent authors have suggested returning some of the Patagonian taxa to Raesaeneniana, but most recent treatments still follow the broader concept proposed by Søchting and colleagues.

== Habitat and distribution ==
Villophora occurs exclusively in the Southern Hemisphere. The protologue describes the genus as either saxicolous—growing directly on rock surfaces—or epiphytic, living on the bark of shrubs and trees. All known populations occupy cool, ocean-influenced regions, and the original authors already suspected that most species were clustered in southern South America.

A later multi-gene revision confirmed that view and mapped the genus's centre of diversity to Patagonia, Tierra del Fuego and adjacent sub-Antarctic localities. Two species (V. darwiniana and V. wallaceana) favour wood and bark in the wind-scoured forests of southern Patagonia, whereas V. onas and V. patagonica grow either on bare rock or as lichenicolous (growing on other lichens) in the same region. The outlier V. rimicola colonises sunlit, nutrient-poor rock fissures on the Antarctic Peninsula, showing the genus's ability to tolerate some of the harshest climates on Earth. Collectively, these records indicate a preference for well-lit, relatively dry microhabitats exposed to frequent mist, frost and salt-laden winds.

== Species ==
As of June 2025, Species Fungorum (in the Catalogue of Life) accepts eight species of Villophora:

- Villophora darwiniana Søchting, Søgaard & Arup (2021)
- Villophora erythrosticta (Taylor) Wilk & Lücking (2021)
- Villophora isidioclada (Zahlbr.) Søchting, Frödén & Arup (2013)
- Villophora maulensis (S.Y.Kondr. & Hur) Søchting (2021)
- Villophora onas Søchting, Søgaard & Arup (2021)
- Villophora patagonica Søchting & Søgaard (2021)
- Villophora rimicola Søchting (2021)
- Villophora wallaceana Søchting & Søgaard (2021)

The proposed taxonVillophora microphyllina (Tuck.) S.Y.Kondr. (2015) has since been recombined into the closely related genus Tayloriellina and is now Tayloriellina microphyllina.
