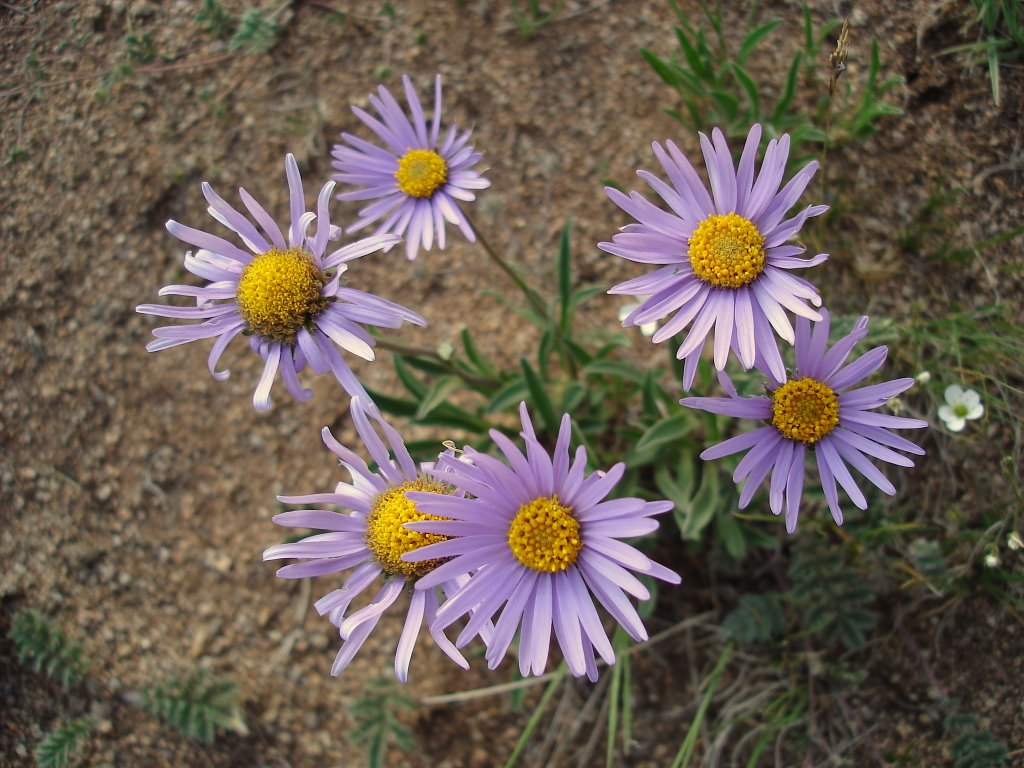
- Heteropappus hispidus

Scientific classification
- Kingdom: Plantae
- Clade: Embryophytes
- Clade: Tracheophytes
- Clade: Angiosperms
- Clade: Eudicots
- Clade: Asterids
- Order: Asterales
- Family: Asteraceae
- Subfamily: Asteroideae
- Tribe: Astereae
- Subtribe: Asterinae
- Genus: Heteropappus; Less.

Type species
- Heteropappus hispidus (Thunb.) Less.

= Heteropappus =

Genus of flowering plants

Heteropappus is a genus of Asian flowering plants in the family Asteraceae.

Species

- Heteropappus biennis (Ledeb.) Tamamsch. ex Grub. - Mongolia
- Heteropappus boweri (Hemsl.) Grierson - Gansu, Qinghai, Xinjiang, Tibet, Yunnan
- Heteropappus chejuensis Kitam. - Korea
- Heteropappus crenatifolius (Hand.-Mazz.) Grierson - China, Tibet, Nepal
- Heteropappus gouldii (C.E.C.Fisch.) Grierson - Qinghai, Tibet, Bhutan, Sikkim
- Heteropappus holohermaphroditus Grierson - Pakistan, Kashmir
- Heteropappus magnicalathinus J.Q.Fu - Shaanxi
- Heteropappus medius (Krylov) Tamamsch. - Altay
- Heteropappus oldhamii (Hemsl.) Kitam. - Taiwan
- Heteropappus rupicola (Vaniot & H.Lév.) Kitam. - Korea
- Heteropappus tataricus (Lindl. ex DC.) Tamamsch. - Japan, Korea, Mongolia, China, Siberia
- Heteropappus villosus Kom. - Russian Far East
