= Tassiloa =

Scientific classification
- Domain: Eukaryota
- Kingdom: Fungi
- Division: Ascomycota
- Class: Lecanoromycetes
- Order: Teloschistales
- Family: Teloschistaceae
- Genus: Tassiloa; S.Y.Kondr., Kärnefelt, A.Thell, Elix & Hur (2015)

Type species
- Tassiloa digitaurea (Søgaard, Søchting & Sancho) S.Y.Kondr., Kärnefelt, A.Thell, Elix, J.Kim, A.S.Kondr. & Hur (2015)

Species
- T. digitaurea T. wetmorei

Genus of lichen-forming fungi

Tassiloa is a genus of lichen-forming fungi in the family Teloschistaceae. It has two species.

== Taxonomy ==
The genus was circumscribed in 2015 by lichenologists Sergey Kondratyuk, Ingvar Kärnefelt, Arne Thell, Elix and Jae-Seoun Hur. According to their molecular phylogenetic analysis, Tassiloa appears as a sister group to the genus Catenarina, in the subfamily Teloschistoideae of family Teloschistaceae. The genus name honours German lichenologist Tassilo Feuerer.

== Description ==
Tassiloa is identifiable by its vibrant orange colouration. Its thallus can range from a crustose appearance to a more elevated, microfruticose form. The surface of the thallus may be either smooth or have a denser texture. This genus is further characterized by lobules that are reminiscent of terete (i.e., cylindrical or slightly tapering) isidia in structure. These lobules or isidia stand out predominantly and align vertically. When considering reproductive attributes, the apothecia of Tassiloa can be categorized as either zeorine or lecanorine. Its true exciple has a paraplectenchymatous tissue structure. In terms of chemistry, Tassiloa contains anthraquinones, notably those linked with the parietin chemosyndrome.

== Habitat and distribution ==
Tassiloa digitaurea is found growing on rock surfaces, detritus, and even over other lichen species. These habitats are typically located within exposed outcrops amidst shrub vegetation and grasslands in coastal regions. Notably, while they are found in coastal areas, their habitats are not strictly maritime. T. wetmorei is parasitic (lichenicolous), targeting various host lichens found on non-calcareous rocks.

Tassiloa species are native to both the American continents. T. digitaurea is identified in southern Patagonia. Meanwhile, T. wetmorei has been recorded in the Sonoran Desert located in southwestern North America.

== Species ==
- Tassiloa digitaurea (Søgaard, Søchting & Sancho) S.Y.Kondr., Kärnefelt, A.Thell, Elix, Jung Kim, A.S.Kondr. & Hur (2015)
- Tassiloa wetmorei (Nimis, Poelt & Tretiach) S.Y.Kondr., Kärnefelt, A.Thell, Elix, Jung Kim, A.S.Kondr. & Hur (2015)

The taxon Tassiloa magellanica (Søchting & Sancho) S.Y.Kondr. (2019) is now known by its original name, Caloplaca magellanica.
