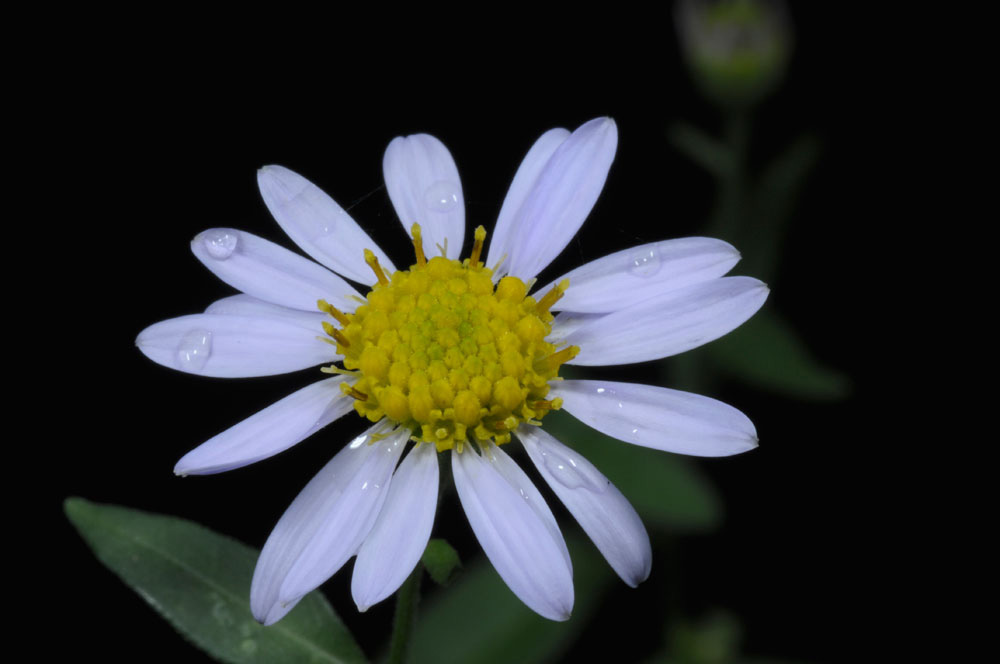
- Inflorescence of Kalimeris indica

Scientific classification
- Kingdom: Plantae
- Clade: Tracheophytes
- Clade: Angiosperms
- Clade: Eudicots
- Clade: Asterids
- Order: Asterales
- Family: Asteraceae
- Genus: Kalimeris
- Species: K. indica

Binomial name
- Kalimeris indica (L.) Sch.Bip.

Synonyms
- Aster cantonensis (Lour.) Courtois; Aster indicus L.; Aster javanicus Garcin ex Burm.f.; Aster ursinus H.Lév. nom. illeg.; Aster yangtzensis Migo; Asteromoea cantoniensis (Lour.) Matsum.; Asteromoea indica (L.) Blume; Boltonia indica (L.) Benth.; Callistemma indicum (L.) G.Don; Callistephus indicus (L.) DC.; Chrysanthemum cuneatum Roxb.; Hisutsua cantonensis (Lour.) DC.; Hisutua cantoniensis (Lour.) DC.; Hisutua serrata Hook. & Arn.; Martinia polymorpha Vaniot; Matricaria cantoniensis Lour.

= Kalimeris indica =

Species of flowering plant

Kalimeris indica, also known as Indian aster or Indian Kalimeris, is a flowering herbaceous perennial plant of the family Asteraceae (Compositae). Kalimeris indica, like other species in the genus of Kalimeris, occurs mainly in eastern Asian countries of China, Korea and Japan, and has been introduced to California and Hawaii.

== Description ==
Kalimeris indica commonly occurs on abandoned farm land, slopes of hills and ridges between rice fields. It is also often found along roads and trails in hardwood forests. It can reproduce sexually through production of seeds and asexually through stolons. Seeds germinate in early spring. Newly emerged seedlings are small with each cotyledon being approximately 2 mm in length.

Indian aster can grow to a height of 30–70 cm. Leaves are alternate and stems are typically upright. Blooming starts in late spring and will continue into October depending on the location and growth conditions for the plant, particularly nutrient level in the soil. Disk florets are light yellow and ray florets are either light purple or white. Fruits of Indian aster are small and dark.

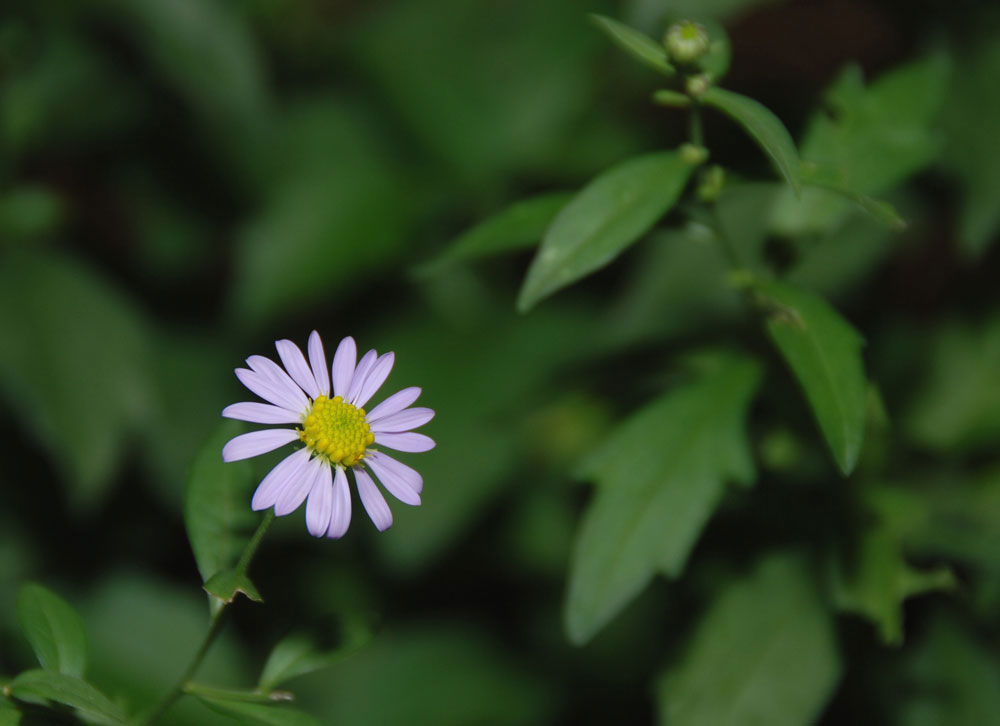
Leaves, stems and inflorescence of Kalimeris indica

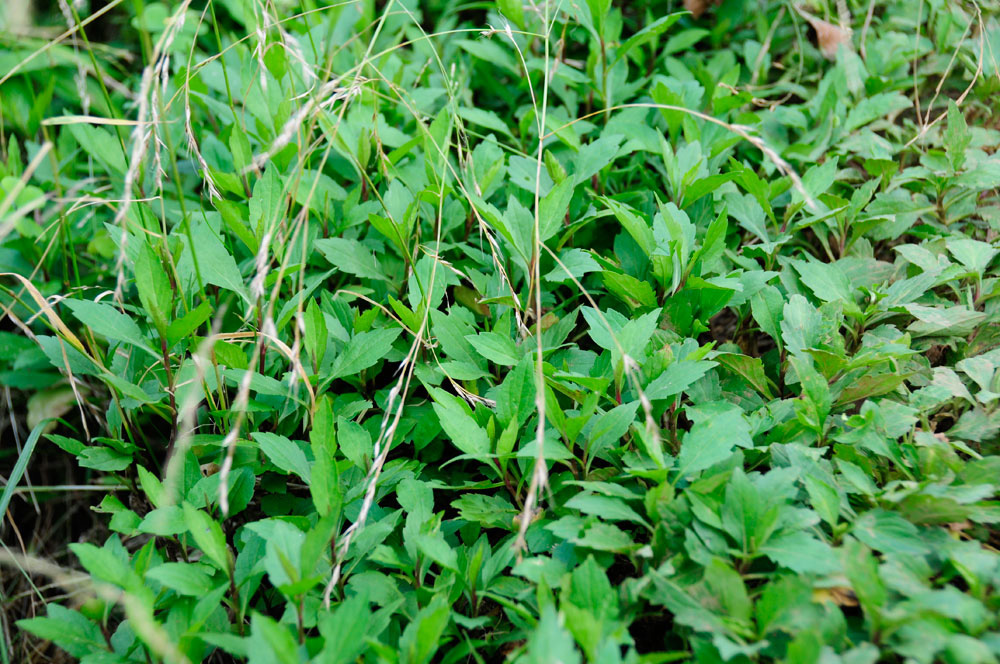
A patch of Kalimeris indica along a rural road

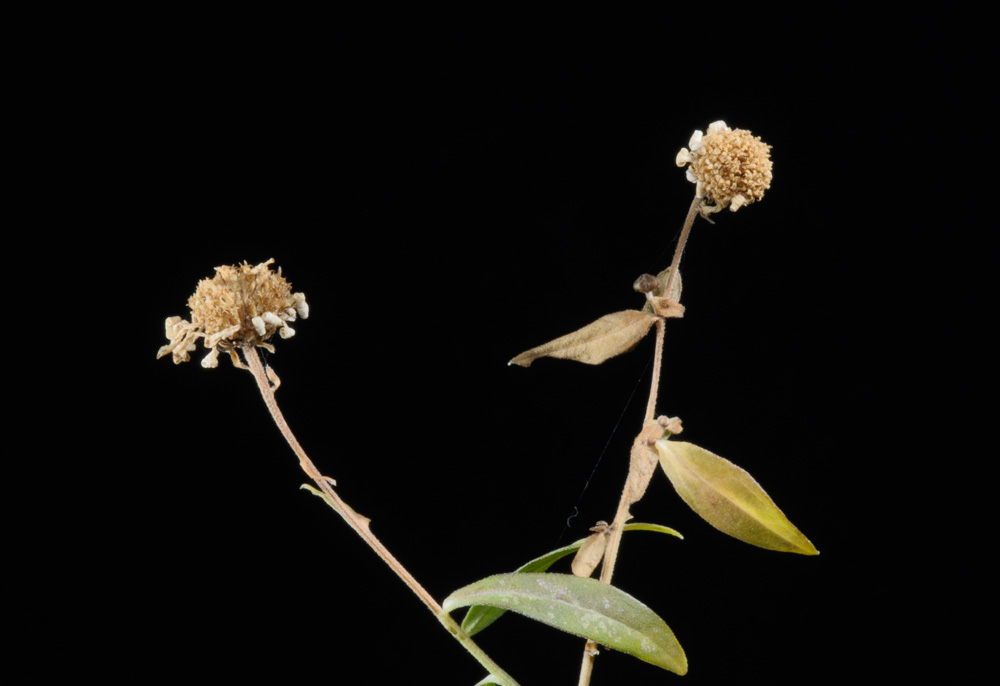
Dried Kalimeris indica inflorescence in winter time

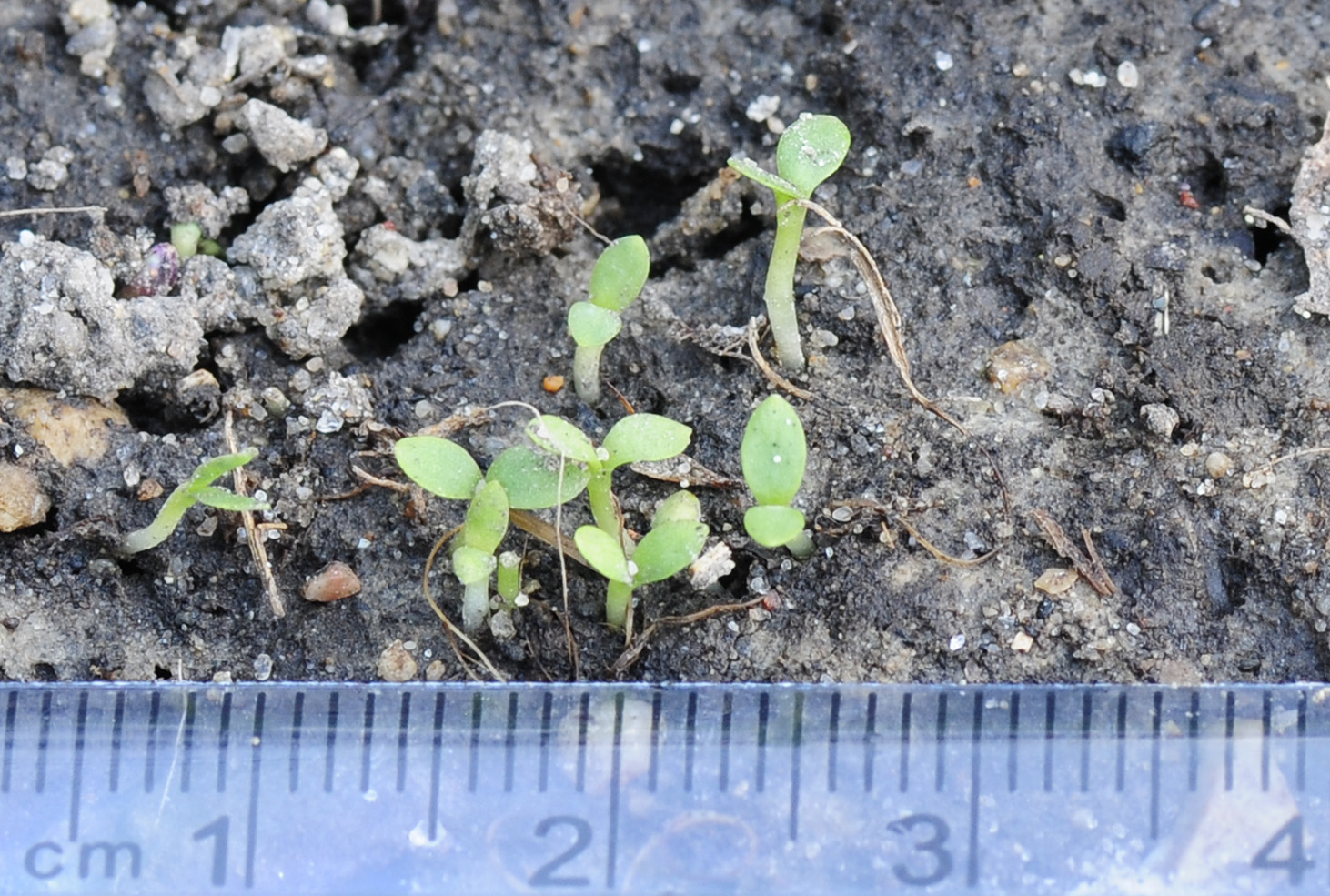
Newly emerged Kalimeris indica seedlings in early spring

== Uses ==
Indian aster has wide culinary uses in East Asia. Young leaves and stems are collected in early spring time and cooked with other food items such as dried tofu (bean curd). It is considered a delicacy because of its special flavor. It is particularly popular south of Yangtze River in China where it is called 马兰头 malantou.

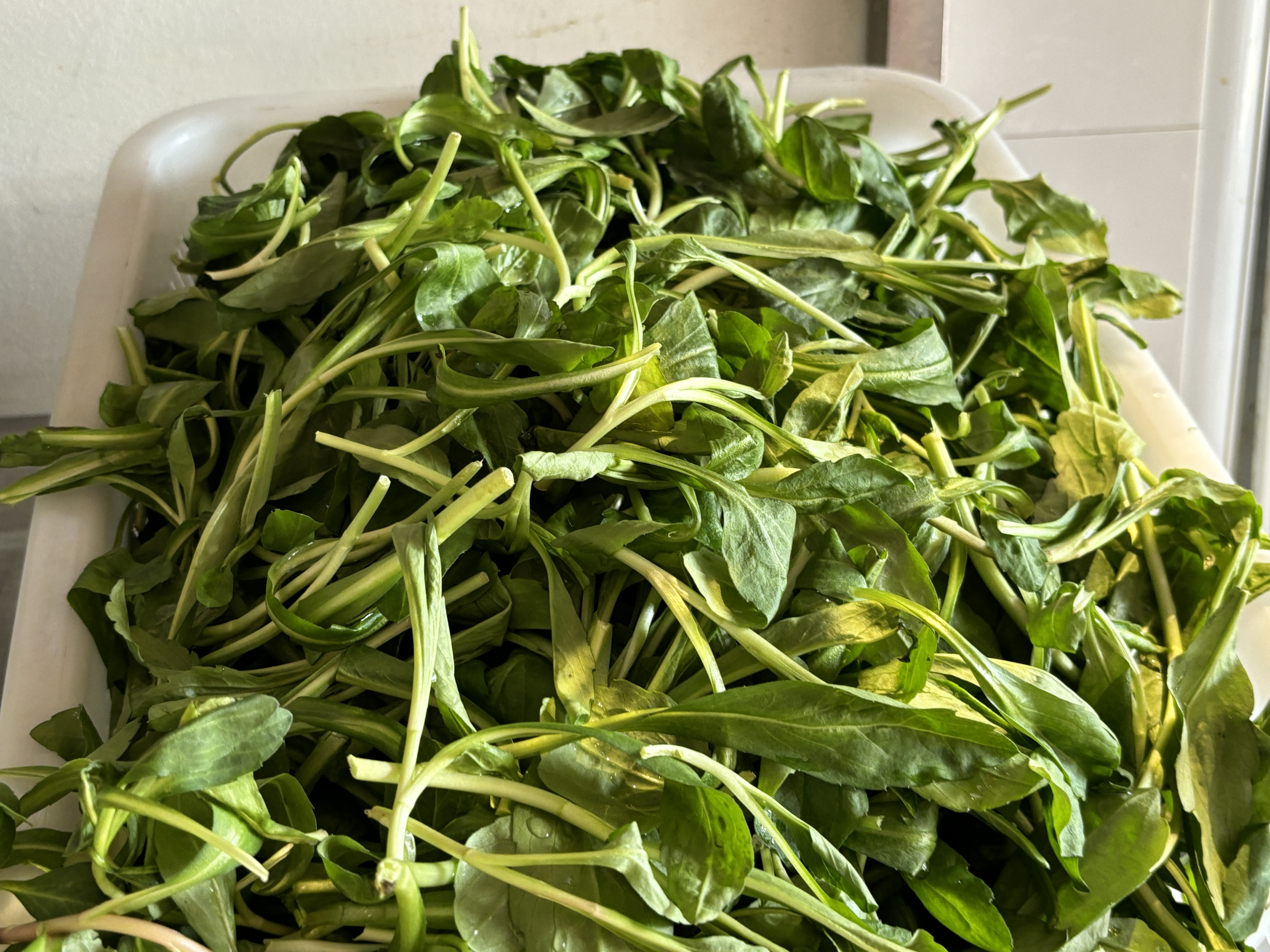
Raw Kalimeris indica

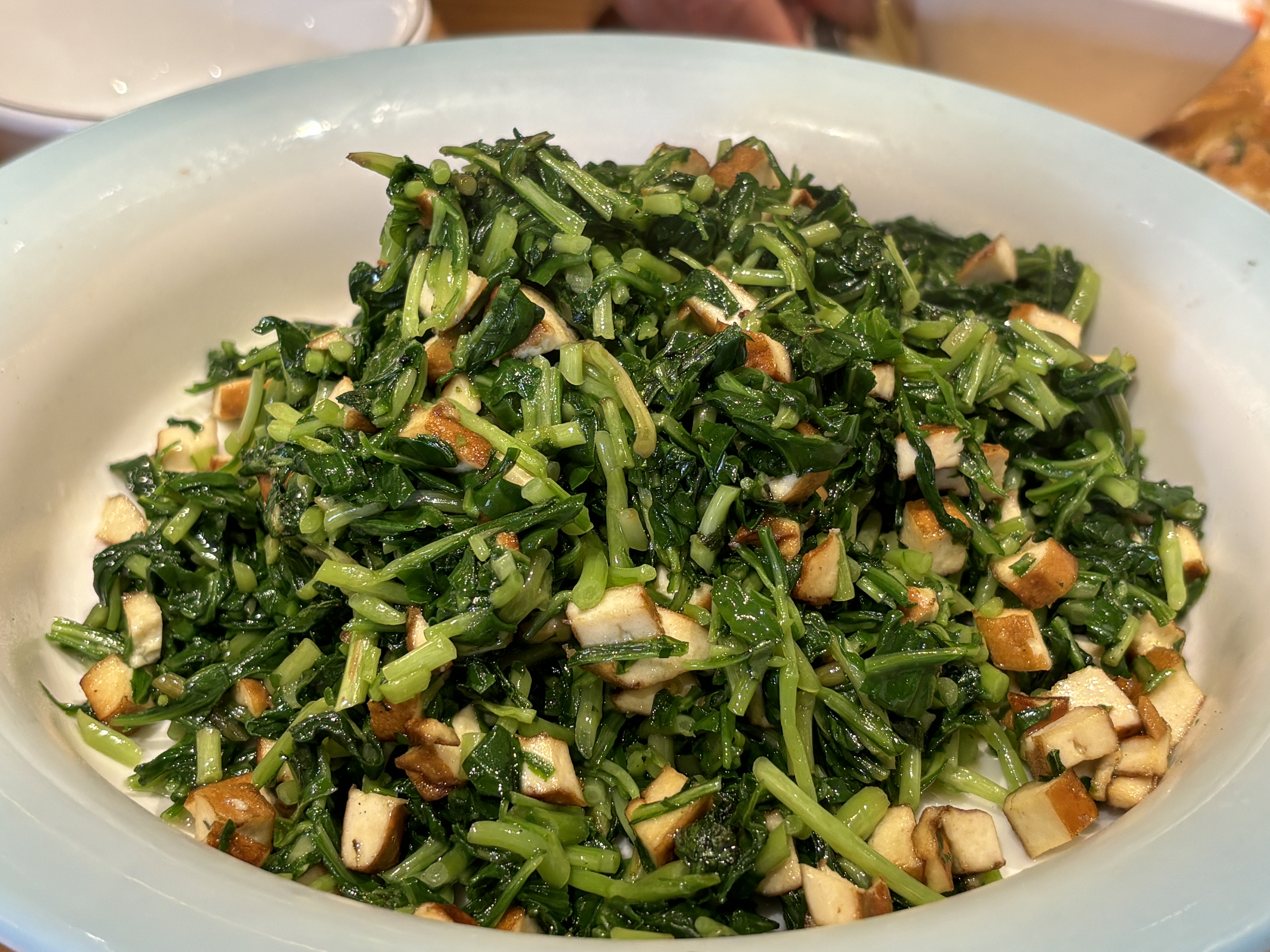
Stir fried malantou with xianggan

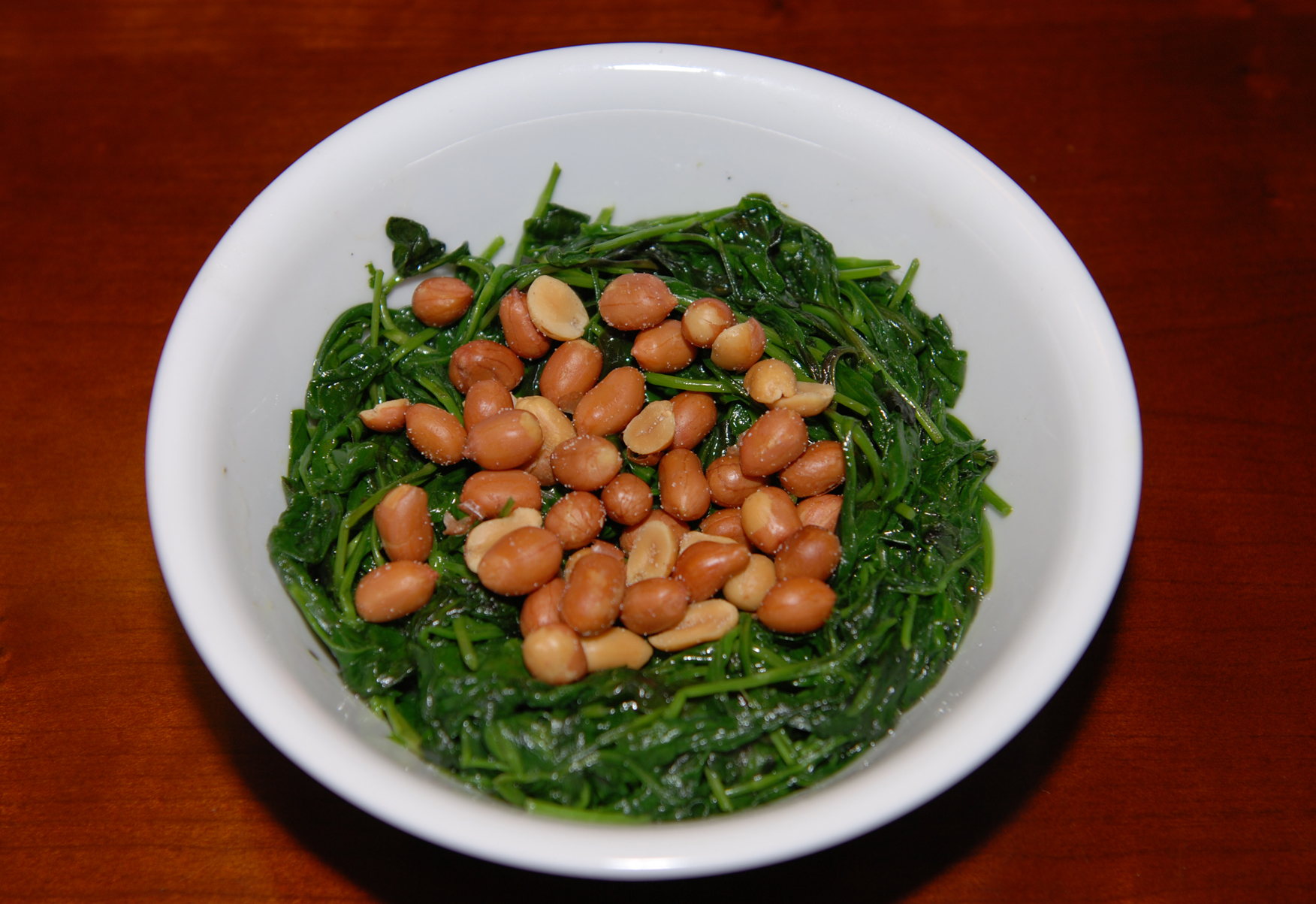
Boiled Kalimeris indica leaves served with salted peanuts
