= Catenarin =

Chemical compound

- Skeletal formula of catenarin

Names
- Preferred IUPAC name 1,4,5,7-tetrahydroxy-2-methylanthracene-9,10-dione
- Other names: 4-Hydroxyemodin; Katenarin; Caterarin

Identifiers
CAS Number	476-46-0
3D model (JSmol)	Interactive image
ChEMBL	ChEMBL29860
ChemSpider	9744
PubChem CID	10150
UNII	EHN5P96V6S
CompTox Dashboard (EPA)	DTXSID50197212
- InChI: InChI=1S/C15H10O6/c1-5-2-8(17)11-12(13(5)19)14(20)7-3-6(16)4-9(18)10(7)15(11)21/h2-4,16-19H,1H3 Key: VWDXGKUTGQJJHJ-UHFFFAOYSA-N
- SMILES: CC1=CC(=C2C(=C1O)C(=O)C3=C(C2=O)C(=CC(=C3)O)O)O

Properties
Chemical formula	C_{15}H_{10}O_{6}
Molar mass	286.239 g·mol^{−1}
- Except where otherwise noted, data are given for materials in their standard state (at 25 °C [77 °F], 100 kPa). Infobox references

Catenarin is a derivative chemical compound of anthraquinone. Its formula is C_{15}H_{10}O_{6}. It is a natural product.

== Occurrence ==
Catenarin has been identified in plants and fungi from various genera, including Pyrenophora, Ventilago, Aspergillus, Catenarina, and Talaromyces.
