= Emodin =

- Skeletal formula

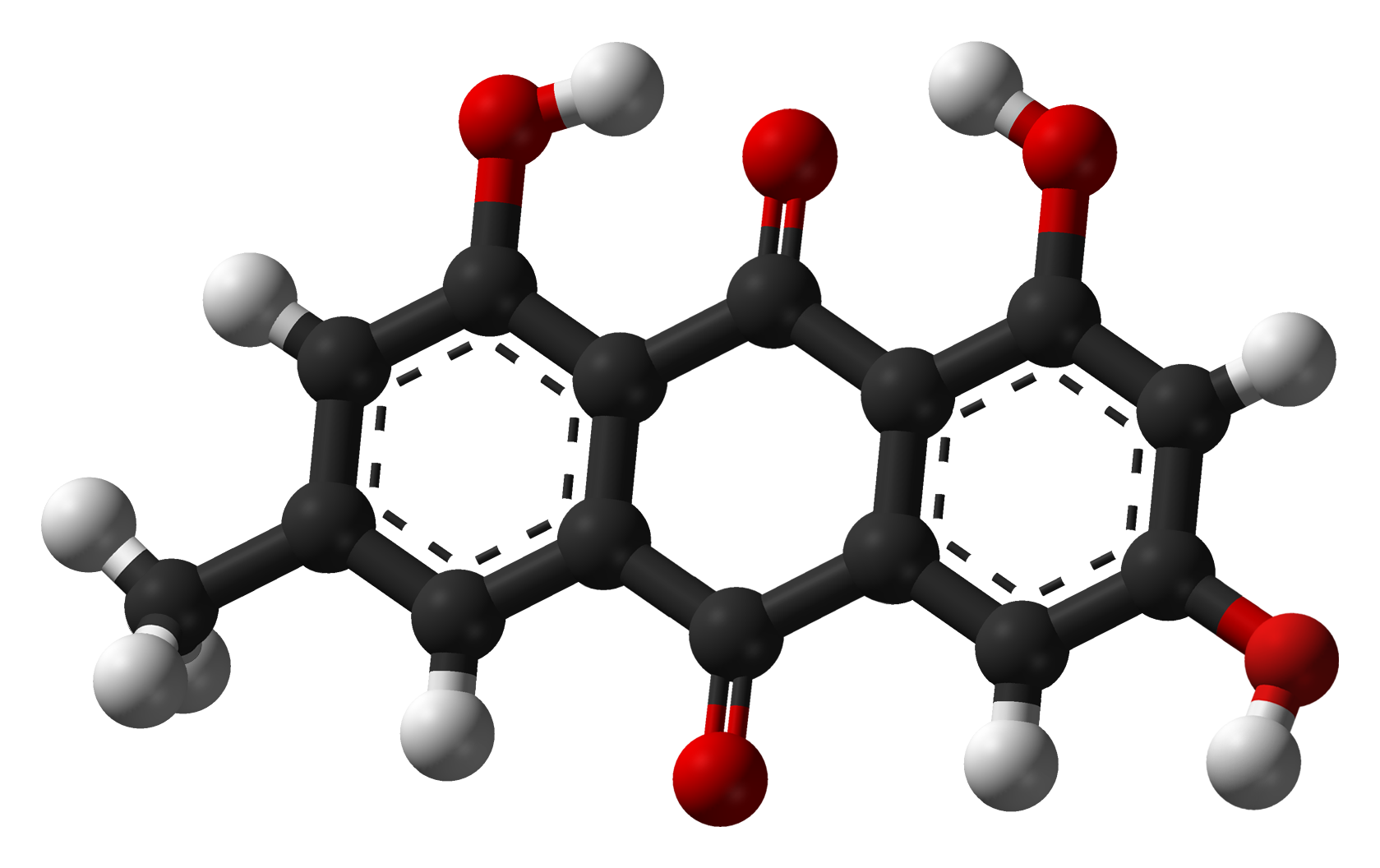
- Ball-and-stick model

Names
- Preferred IUPAC name 1,3,8-Trihydroxy-6-methylanthracene-9,10-dione
- Other names 6-Methyl-1,3,8-trihydroxyanthraquinone

Identifiers
CAS Number	518-82-1
3D model (JSmol)	Interactive image
ChEBI	CHEBI:42223
ChEMBL	ChEMBL289277
ChemSpider	3107
DrugBank	DB07715
ECHA InfoCard	100.007.509
KEGG	C10343
PubChem CID	3220
UNII	KA46RNI6HN
CompTox Dashboard (EPA)	DTXSID5025231
- InChI: InChI=1S/C15H10O5/c1-6-2-8-12(10(17)3-6)15(20)13-9(14(8)19)4-7(16)5-11(13)18/h2-5,16-18H,1H3 Key: RHMXXJGYXNZAPX-UHFFFAOYSA-N; InChI=1/C15H10O5/c1-6-2-8-12(10(17)3-6)15(20)13-9(14(8)19)4-7(16)5-11(13)18/h2-5,16-18H,1H3 Key: RHMXXJGYXNZAPX-UHFFFAOYAD
- SMILES: O=C2c1cc(cc(O)c1C(=O)c3c2cc(O)cc3O)C

Properties
Chemical formula	C_{15}H_{10}O_{5}
Molar mass	270.240 g·mol^{−1}
Appearance	Orange solid
Density	1.583±0.06 g/cm3
Melting point	256 to 257 °C (493 to 495 °F; 529 to 530 K)
Solubility in water	4.3 x 10^{-6} mol/L

Hazards
- GHS labelling
Pictograms	
Hazard statements	H315, H319, H335
Precautionary statements	P261, P264, P264+P265, P271, P280, P302+P352, P304+P340, P305+P351+P338, P319, P321, P332+P317, P337+P317, P362+P364, P403+P233, P405, P501
- Except where otherwise noted, data are given for materials in their standard state (at 25 °C [77 °F], 100 kPa). verify (what is ?) Infobox references

Emodin (6-methyl-1,3,8-trihydroxyanthraquinone) is an organic compound. Classified as an anthraquinone, it can be isolated from rhubarb, buckthorn, and Japanese knotweed (Reynoutria japonica syn. Polygonum cuspidatum). Emodin is particularly abundant in the roots of the Chinese rhubarb (Rheum palmatum), knotweed and knotgrass (Polygonum cuspidatum and Polygonum multiflorum) as well as Hawaii 'au'auko'i cassia seeds or coffee weed (Semen cassia). It is specifically isolated from Rheum palmatum L. It is also produced by many species of fungi, including members of the genera Aspergillus, Pyrenochaeta, and Pestalotiopsis, inter alia. The common name is derived from Rheum emodi, a taxonomic synonym of Rheum australe (Himalayan rhubarb), and synonyms include emodol, frangula emodin, rheum emodin, 3-methyl-1,6,8-trihydroxyanthraquinone, Schüttgelb (Schuttgelb), and Persian Berry Lake.

== Pharmacology ==
Emodin is an active component of several plants used in traditional Chinese medicine (TCM) such as Rheum palmatum, Polygonum cuspidatum, and Polygonum multiflorum. It has various actions including laxative, anticancer, antibacterial and antiinflammatory effects, and has also been identified as having potential antiviral activity against coronaviruses such as SARS-CoV-2, being one of the major active components of the antiviral TCM formulation Lianhua Qingwen.

Emodin has been shown to inhibit the ion channel of protein 3a, which could play a role in the release of the virus from infected cells.

== List of species ==
The following plant species are known to produce emodin:

- Acalypha australis
- Cassia occidentalis
- Cassia siamea
- Frangula alnus
- Glossostemon bruguieri
- Kalimeris indica
- Polygonum hypoleucum
- Reynoutria japonica (syn. Fallopia japonica) (syn. Polygonum cuspidatum)
- Rhamnus alnifolia, the alderleaf buckthorn
- Rhamnus cathartica, the common buckthorn
- Rheum palmatum
- Rumex nepalensis
- Senna obtusifolia (syn. Cassia obtusifolia)
- Thielavia subthermophila
- Ventilago madraspatana

Emodin also occurs in variable amounts in members of the crustose lichen genus Catenarina.

== Compendial status ==
- British Pharmacopoeia
- List of compounds with carbon number 15
