= Josefpoeltia =

Scientific classification
- Domain: Eukaryota
- Kingdom: Fungi
- Division: Ascomycota
- Class: Lecanoromycetes
- Order: Teloschistales
- Family: Teloschistaceae
- Genus: Josefpoeltia; S.Y.Kondr. & Kärnefelt (1997)

Type species
- Josefpoeltia boliviensis S.Y.Kondr. & Kärnefelt (1997)

Species
- J. boliviensis J. parva J. sorediosa

Genus of lichens

Josefpoeltia is a genus of lichen-forming fungi in the family Teloschistaceae. It has three species. The genus was circumscribed in 1997 by lichenologists Sergey Kondratyuk and Ingvar Kärnefelt, with J. boliviensis assigned as the type species. The genus name honours lichenologist Josef Poelt, (1924-1995) who was a German-Austrian botanist (Bryology, Mycology and Lichenology) and was Professor of Systematic Botany at the Free University of Berlin in 1965.

== Species ==
- Josefpoeltia boliviensis S.Y.Kondr. & Kärnefelt (1997)
- Josefpoeltia parva (Räsänen) Frödén & L.Lindblom (2003)
- Josefpoeltia sorediosa S.Y.Kondr. & Kärnefelt (1997)
