= Circassian genocide =

Mass murder of Circassians by the Russian Empire

- Part of the Russo-Circassian War
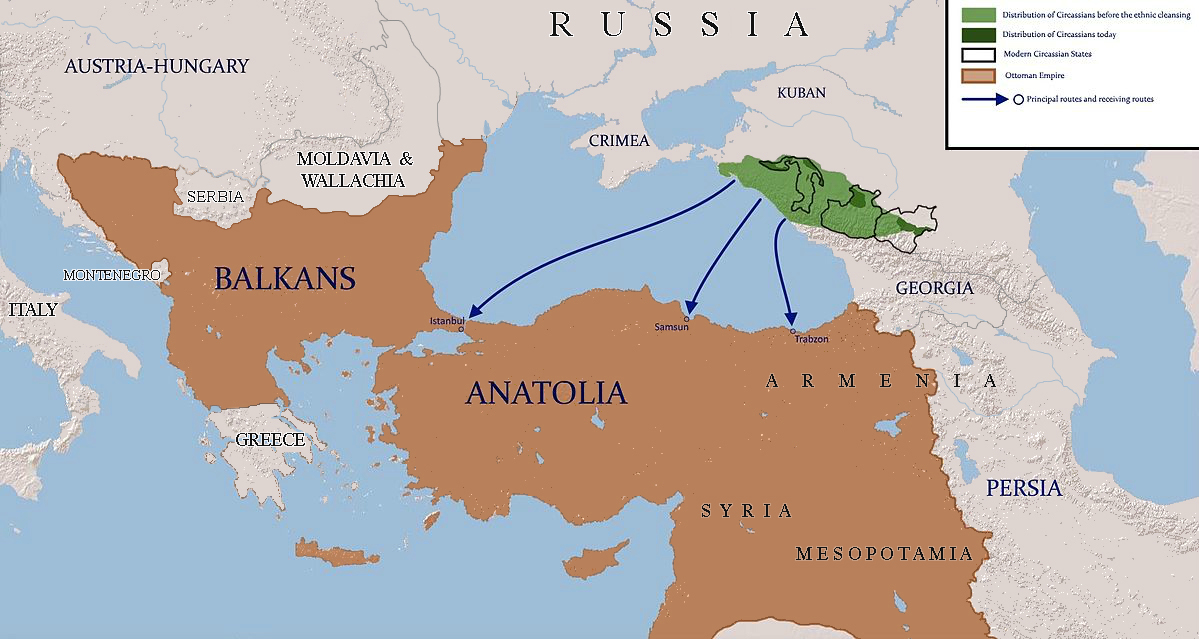
- Demographic change in the Western Caucasus following the Circassian genocide. Survivors were primarily those who fled or were expelled, hid in marshes and caves, or, in rare cases, made successful agreements with the Imperial Russian Army.
- Native name: ЦӀыцӀэкӀун (tsʼətsʼakʷʼən), in the Ubykh language
- Location: Circassia
- Date: 1863–1878
- Target: Circassians and other Caucasian peoples
- Attack type: Genocide (mass killings, mass rape) and ethnic cleansing (forced displacement, death marches)
- Deaths: 1,500,000–2,000,000: 1,000,000–1,500,000 killed directly or indirectly; 500,000 died whilst fleeing
- Victims: 95–97% of the Circassian population 1,000,000–1,500,000 displaced
- Perpetrator: Russian Empire
- Motive: Imperialism; Russification; Islamophobia; Christianization

The Circassian genocide, or Tsitsekun, (Note: Ubykh: tsʼətsʼakʷʼən, цӀыцӀэкӀун.) (Note: This word is used by the Circassians to refer to the events and originates from the now-extinct Ubykh language. When asked the full meaning, Tevfik Esenç, the last speaker of Ubykh, stated that it means "a massacre so evil that only Satan could think of it". The word comes from "tsʼətsʼa" (people) and "kʷʼə-" (to kill). According to one theory, it comes from the surname of Pavel Tsitsianov, one of the first Russian generals in the Russo-Circassian War to engage in massacres. However, this theory is likely folk etymology.) was the systematic mass killing, ethnic cleansing, and forced displacement of between 95% and 97% (Note: "between 95 percent and 97 percent of all Circassians were killed outright, died during Evdokimov's campaign, or were deported") (Note: 95% to 97% of the entire Circassian population had been killed or deported in what contemporary Russian field reports referred to as an ochishchenie ("cleansing")") of the Circassian people during the final stages of the Russian invasion of Circassia in the 19th century. It resulted in the deaths of up to 1.5 million people and the destruction of Circassia, which was then annexed by the Russian Empire. (Note: "In the 1860s Russia killed 1.5 million Circassians, half of their population, and expelled the other half from their lands." Ahmed 2013, p. 357) Those planned for extermination were mainly the Circassians, who are predominantly Muslims, but other ethnic groups in the Caucasus were also affected, as part of the Caucasian War. The Imperial Russian Army also impaled their victims and tore open the bellies of pregnant women to intimidate the Circassians and devastate their morale. Many Russian generals, such as Grigory Zass, described the Circassians as a "lowly race" to justify and glorify their wholesale slaughter and their use as human test subjects in unethical scientific experiments. Russian soldiers were also permitted to rape Circassian women.

The native Circassian population was largely decimated or expelled to the Ottoman Empire. Only those who accepted Russification and made agreements with Russian troops, were spared. Starvation was used as a tool of war against Circassian villages, many of which were subsequently burned down. Russian writer Leo Tolstoy reported that Russian soldiers attacked village houses at night. British diplomat Gifford Palgrave, stated that "their only crime was not being Russian." Seeking military intervention against Russia, Circassian officials sent "A Petition from Circassian leaders to Her Majesty Queen Victoria" in 1864, but were unsuccessful in their attempt to solicit aid from the British Empire. That same year, the Imperial Russian Army launched a campaign of mass deportation of Circassia's surviving population. By 1867, a large portion of the Circassians were expelled. Many died from epidemics or starvation. Some were reportedly eaten by dogs after their death, while others died when their ships sank during storms on the Black Sea.

Most sources state that as little as 3% of Circassia's population remained after the genocide and that as many as 1.5 million people were forced to flee in total, though only about half of them survived the journey. Ottoman archives show the intake of more than a million immigrants from the Caucasus by 1879, with nearly half of them having been found dying on the shores of the Black Sea as a result of disease. Assuming that these statistics are accurate, Russia's military campaign in Circassia constitutes the single largest genocide of the 19th century. Russian records, in confirmation of the Ottoman archives, documented the presence of only 106,798 Circassians in the Caucasus at the turn of the 20th century. Other estimates by Russian historiographers are even lower, ranging from 40,400 to 65,900. The Russian Empire census, conducted in 1897, reported the presence of 150,000 Circassians in the conquered region.

On 20 May 2011, Georgia formally recognized the Circassian genocide. Ukraine recognized the Circassian genocide on 9 January 2025, following Circassian appeals in June 2024. The city of Wayne, New Jersey in the United States and the East Turkistan Government in Exile have also officially recognized the Circassian genocide. On 7 February 1992 the Kabardino-Balkarian Autonomous Soviet Socialist Republic condemned the Circassian Genocide. On 12 May 1994 the Republic of Kabardino-Balkaria and on 29 April 1996 the Republic of Adygea submitted applications to the State Duma of the Russian Federation for the recognition of the Circassian Genocide. In October 2006, over 20 Circassian associations appealed to the European Parliament to recognize the Circassian Genocide. In November 2006, Circassian associations in the Republics of Adygea, Kabardino-Balkaria and Karachay-Cherkessia appealed to Russian president Vladimir Putin to recognize the Circassian Genocide. The Russian Federation classifies the events in Circassia as a mass migration ("muhajirism", Russian: Черкесское мухаджирство, Cherkesskoye mukhadzhirstvo, lit. 'Circassian muhajirism') and denies that a genocide took place. 21 May is observed annually as the Circassian Day of Mourning, which consists of ceremonies and marches in memory of the victims and, sometimes, protests against the Russian government. Today, the Circassian diaspora is primarily concentrated in Turkey and Jordan, with some 750,000 living in Russia's North Caucasus Economic Region.

== Background ==
In the late 18th and early 19th centuries, although it had already been making attempts since the early 18th century, the Russian Empire began to more actively seek to expand its territory to the south at the expense of the neighboring Ottoman Empire and Qajar Iran, specifically aiming to incorporate the Caucasus into its domain. Some areas proved easier to incorporate than others, largely depending on the nature of local political structures. Eastern Georgia for example, comprising the most powerful and dominant Georgian regions of Kartli and Kakheti, had been under intermittent Iranian suzerainty since the 1555 Peace of Amasya. Russia eventually found itself able, through instability in the geopolitical situation of Georgia within Qajar Iran, to annex eastern Georgia in the early 19th century, ratified in the 1803 Treaty of Gulistan.

Russia endeavored to bring the entire Caucasus region under its control, conquering Armenia, Caucasian Azerbaijan, and southern Dagestan, while co-opting the nobility of other areas such as Lower Kabardia and parts of Dagestan. Although the Russians faced considerable resistance to incorporation in Dagestan and Georgia, as well as military resistance by the local government of Imereti, the regions they felt most difficult of all to incorporate were those that had not been conquered by foreign empires and did not have any local monopolies of power—which was the state of most Circassian territories, where resistance to absorption into the Russian Empire was most tenacious. Prior to the perpetration of genocide by Tsarist Russia, more than 4 million Circassians lived in their homeland in the Caucasus.

The Russian empire's decision to launch genocide against Circassians was driven by anti-Muslim sentiments and by Tsarist Russia's "messianic self-image" as the champion of Eastern Orthodoxy against non-Christian inhabitants in its territories. Russian Tsars viewed the Circassian tribes in the Caucasus as "primitive" humans to either be forcibly converted to Christianity or exterminated and expelled. Imperial army generals further regarded Circassia as a strategic territory to advance Russian expansionism in the Caucasus and surrounding lands.

== Prelude: Russo-Circassian War ==
=== Start of conflicts with Circassia ===
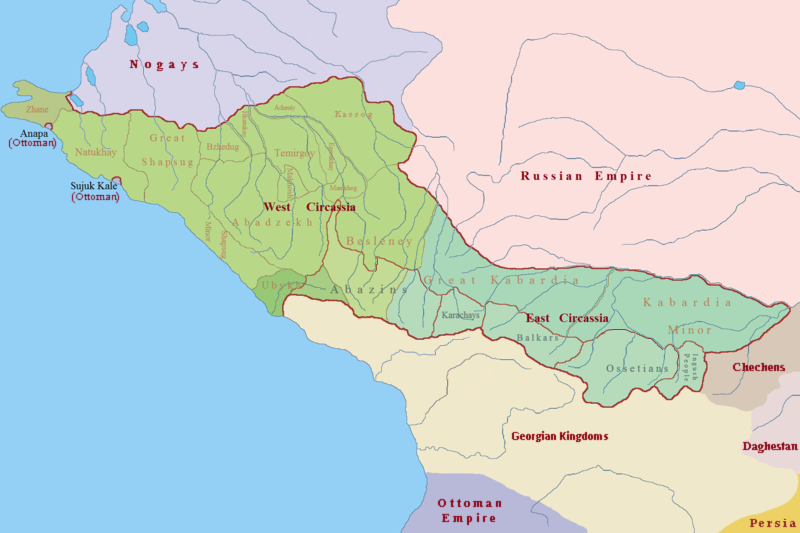
Circassia in 1750

Circassians, Christianised through Byzantine influence between the 5th and 6th centuries, were generally allied with Georgians. From the 16th century they entered into alliance with Georgia: Georgians and Circassians regarded themselves as constituting a single Christian island in the Black Sea and jointly appealed to Russia for protection. Although there had previously been a small Muslim presence in Circassia, significant conversions came after 1717, when Sultan Murad IV ordered the Crimeans to spread Islam among the Circassians, with the Ottomans seeing success in converting members of the aristocracy who would then ultimately spread the religion to their dependents; Islam gained much more ground later as conversion came to be used to cement defensive alliances to protect their independence against Russian expansion.

During the reign of Catherine II, the Russian army started entering Circassian soil and erecting forts, in an attempt at quick annexation. In 1763, Russian forces occupied the town of Mezdeug (modern-day Mozdok) in Eastern Circassia, turning it into a Russian fortress. Thus began the first hostilities between Circassians and the Russian Empire.

In 1764, Circassian prince Misost Bematuqo Hatokhshoqo started the Circassian resistance in Kabardia (Eastern Circassia). Hatokhshoqo's resistance was strengthened on 18 October 1768, when the Ottoman sultan, who had recently declared war on Russia, sent a letter to Hatokhshoqo stating that he, through his authority as caliph, was concurrently ordering all Muslims of the Caucasus to officially wage war against Russia. Russia subsequently annexed the Crimean Khanate in violation of the 1774 Treaty of Küçük Kaynarca with the Ottoman Empire, and following these events, Russian presence in the region increased, with the Circassians requesting help and alliances from the Ottomans.

Russia introduced courts in Kabardia (Eastern Circassia) in the early 1790s and abolished Adyghe Khabze, the traditional moral code of the Circassians, greatly angering them.

=== Methods of massacre ===
In 1799, Russian general Fyodor Bursak organized several raids against the Western Circassians, and ordered his men to burn Circassian villages, including those loyal to the Russian Empire. From 1802 to 1806, General Pavel Tsitsianov led campaigns in Circassia and targeted Circassian villages. He referred to the Circassians as "untrustworthy swine" to "show how insignificant they are compared to Russia".

In 1805, a plague struck Kabardia. Using this as an excuse, General Glazenap ordered his forces to burn down 80 villages to terrorize the people into submission and to wreak vengeance upon the Kabardians.

A village burning campaign started, in which the Circassian population were burnt without separation. First, the Russian army would enter and loot a Circassian village, then they would kill those who resisted or complained, and finally, they would set fire to the village and make sure all inhabitants were killed. In 1810 about 200 villages were burned. The population of Kabarda, which was 350,000 in 1763, was only 37,000 in 1817.

In 1808, a Russian commission decided that in order to end Circassian resistance against the Russian Empire, the Circassians would need to be eliminated from their homeland. In February 1810, General Fyodor Bursak's forces entered a Circassian village near the Sop River and proceeded to burn the village. They decided to postpone their plans to attack the next village when the river began to overflow. In December, the same methods were applied in the Shapsug region, and several villages were burnt. After some civilians deserted to the forests, forests in the region were burnt down. In 1811, petitions were sent to St. Petersburg in Russia, appealing for the basic rights of Circassians in the occupied areas.

In 1817, Russian veteran general Aleksey Yermolov arrived in the Caucasus. Deciding that Circassians would not surrender willingly, General Yermolov concluded that "terror" as an official strategy would be effective. Although terror methods were already in use, they were only officialized after Yermolov's orders. Russian generals began to destroy Circassian villages and towns and slaughter people as part of an official duty to shock the population into surrender. Under Yermolov, Russian troops retaliated by destroying villages where resistance fighters were thought to hide, as well as employing assassinations, kidnappings and the execution of whole families. Because the resistance was relying on sympathetic villages for food, the Russian military also systematically destroyed crops and livestock and killed Circassian civilian farmers. Circassians responded by creating a tribal federation encompassing all tribes of the area.

In May 1818, the village of Tram was surrounded, burnt, and its inhabitants killed by Russian forces under the command of General Ivan Petrovich Delpotso, who took orders from Yermolov and who then wrote to the Circassian forces:

This time, I am limiting myself on this. In the future, I will have no mercy for the guilty brigands; their villages will be destroyed, properties taken, wives and children will be slaughtered.

— Ivan Petrovich Delpotso

The complete destruction of villages with everything within them became a standard action by the Russian army and Cossack units. Nevertheless, the Circassian resistance continued. Villages that had previously accepted Russian rule were found resisting again, much to the ire of Russian commanders.

In September 1820, Russian forces began to forcibly resettle inhabitants of Eastern Circassia. Military forces were sent into Kabardia, killing cattle and causing large numbers of inhabitants to flee into the mountains, with the land these inhabitants had once lived on being acquired for the Kuban Cossacks. The entirety of Kabardia (Eastern Circassia) was then declared property of the Russian government.

General Yermolov accelerated his efforts in Kabardia, with the month of March 1822 alone seeing 14 villages being destroyed as Yermolov led expeditions. In February 1824, the Russian army led by General Vlasov attacked the Circassian villages of Jambut, Aslan, Morza, and Tsab Dadhika and completely destroyed them, along with the inhabitants, despite the villages being at peace with the Russian Empire. In 1828, General Emanuel destroyed 6 Natukhaj Circassian villages and many more Shapsug Circassian villages. He then passed the Kuban and burned 210 more villages.

The Treaty of Adrianople was signed on 14 September 1829. According to the document, Circassia was given by the Ottoman Empire to Russia. The Circassians considered it invalid, arguing that because their territory had been independent of the Ottomans, Istanbul had no right to cede it. Circassian ambassadors were sent to England, France and Ottoman lands announcing that they denied the treaty under all conditions.

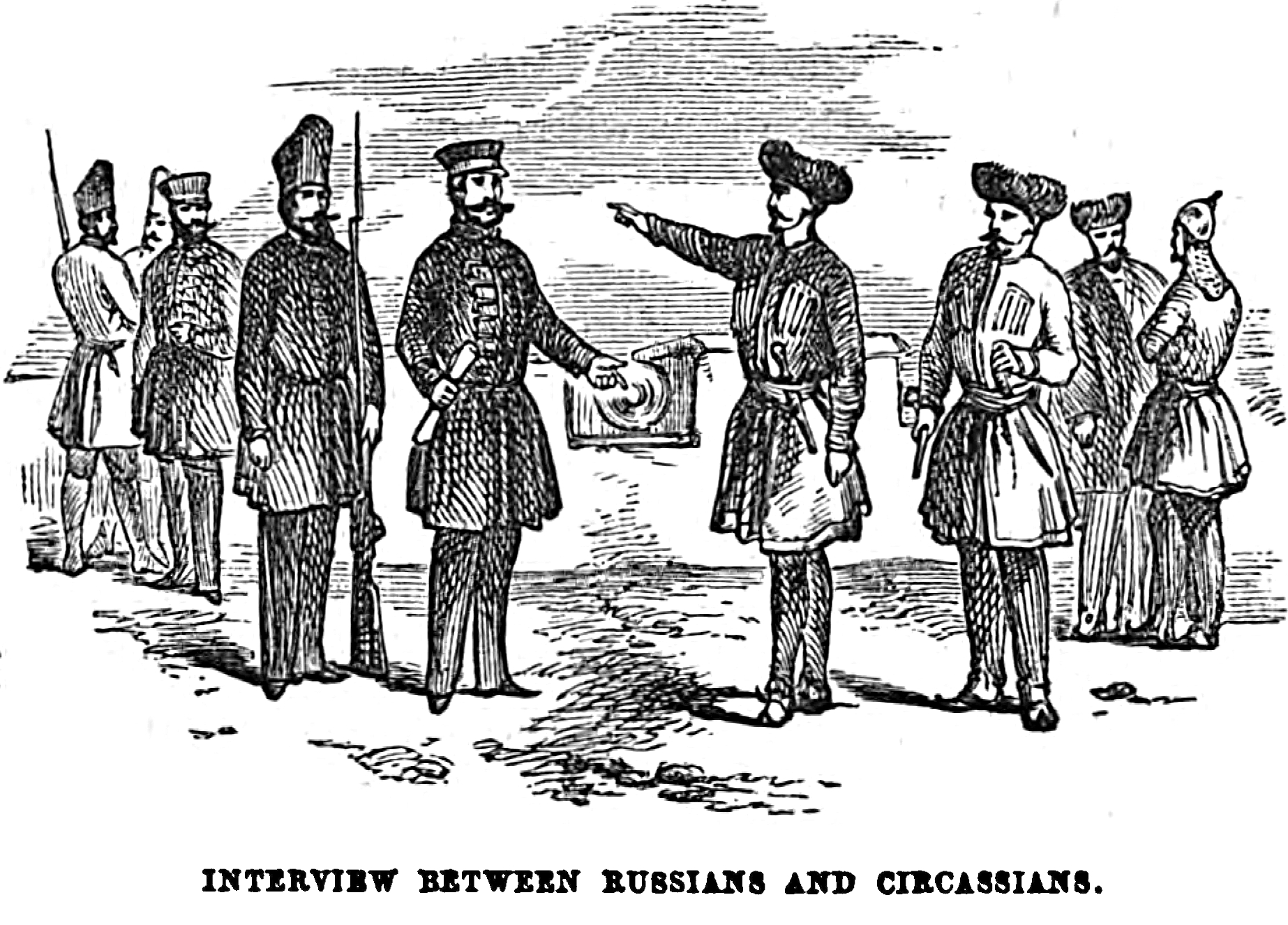
Russian military and Circassian representatives meet for discussions, 1855

In 1831, the Russian government considered the destruction of the Natukhaj tribe in favor of populating their land on the northern coast of the Black Sea with Cossacks. In late 1831, in retaliation for Circassian attacks against Cossack military bases, Russian General Frolov and his task force destroyed several villages. Beginning the night of November 20, a "horror campaign" was started, in which villages were surrounded by artillery and bombarded. The targets were local homes, as well as mosques. The operation was described in a report:

In this affair the Russians lost 10 soldiers and had one officer and 16 soldiers wounded. At the scene of the battle there were more than 150 bodies of Circassians killed by bayonets and up to 50 women and children killed from the action of the Russian artillery.

In another report, General Rosen described how, in December 1831, 381 Circassians were captured by his forces and boasted about taking them prisoner and firing at villages, leaving 100 men and 50 women dead. He goes on to detail how when setting fire to a village, a Russian soldier named Midvideiv (or Medvedev) killed a Circassian who tried to stop him from burning down a mosque.

The Russians countered the heavy Circassian resistance by modifying the terrain. They laid down a network of roads and cleared the forests around these roads, destroyed native villages, and often settled new farming communities of Russians or other Orthodox Slavic people. In this increasingly bloody situation, the wholesale destruction of villages became a standard tactic.

General Yermolov remarked that "We need the Circassian lands, but we don't have any need of the Circassians themselves". Russian military commanders, such as Yermolov and Bulgakov, acting in their own interests to attain glory on the battlefield and riches through conquest, which would be much more difficult to attain on the Western front than in the Caucasus, often deceived the central administration and obscured the attempts of Circassian groups to establish peace with Russia.

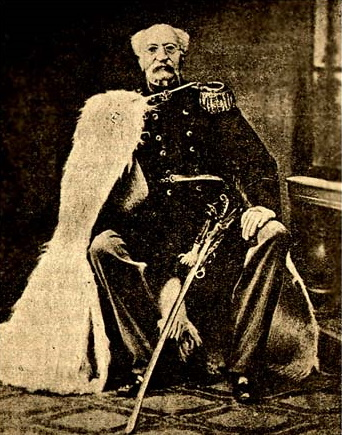
Russian imperial army general Grigory Zass, who became notorious for implementing extremely murderous policies against Circassians during the Russo-Circassian War and the Circassian genocide. In addition to carrying out brutal massacres of Circassian women and children, various cruel practices perpetrated by Zass included collecting skulls and amputated body parts of Circassians.

In 1833, Colonel Grigory Zass was appointed commander of a part of the Kuban Military Line with headquarters in the Batalpashinsk fortress. Colonel Zass received wide authority to act as he saw fit. He was a racist who considered Circassians to be inferior. The only way to deal with the Circassians, in his opinion, was to scare them away "just like wild animals". Zass advocated ruthless military methods predicated on this notion, including burning people alive, cutting off heads with show, burning populated villages to the ground, spreading epidemics on purpose, and mass rape of children. He kept a box under his bed with his collection of severed Circassian body parts. He operated in all areas of Circassia.

Zass's main strategy was to intercept and retain the initiative, terrorize the Circassians, and destroy Circassian settlements. After a victory, he would usually burn several villages and seize cattle and horses to show off, acts which he proudly admitted. In his reports, he frequently boasted about the destruction of villages and glorified the mass murder of civilians.

In August 1833, Zass led his first expedition into Circassian territory, with the goal being destroying as many villages and towns as possible. He attacked the Besleney region between November and December, destroying most villages, including the village of the double agent Aytech Qanoqo. He continued to exterminate the Circassian population between 1834 and 1835, particularly in the Abdzakh, Besleney, Shapsug, and Kabardian regions. Zass's forces referred to Circassians as "savages", "bandits", "plunderers" or "thieves", despite the fact that said forces included political dissidents and criminals.

In 1834, Zass sent a report to Rosen detailing his campaign into Circassia. He talks about how he killed three Circassian civilians on their way to fetch grass:

I captured three Circassians from carriages that were on their way to fetch grass, other than the thirteen we already had, who did not wish to surrender to us voluntarily, so I ordered [them] to [be] killed

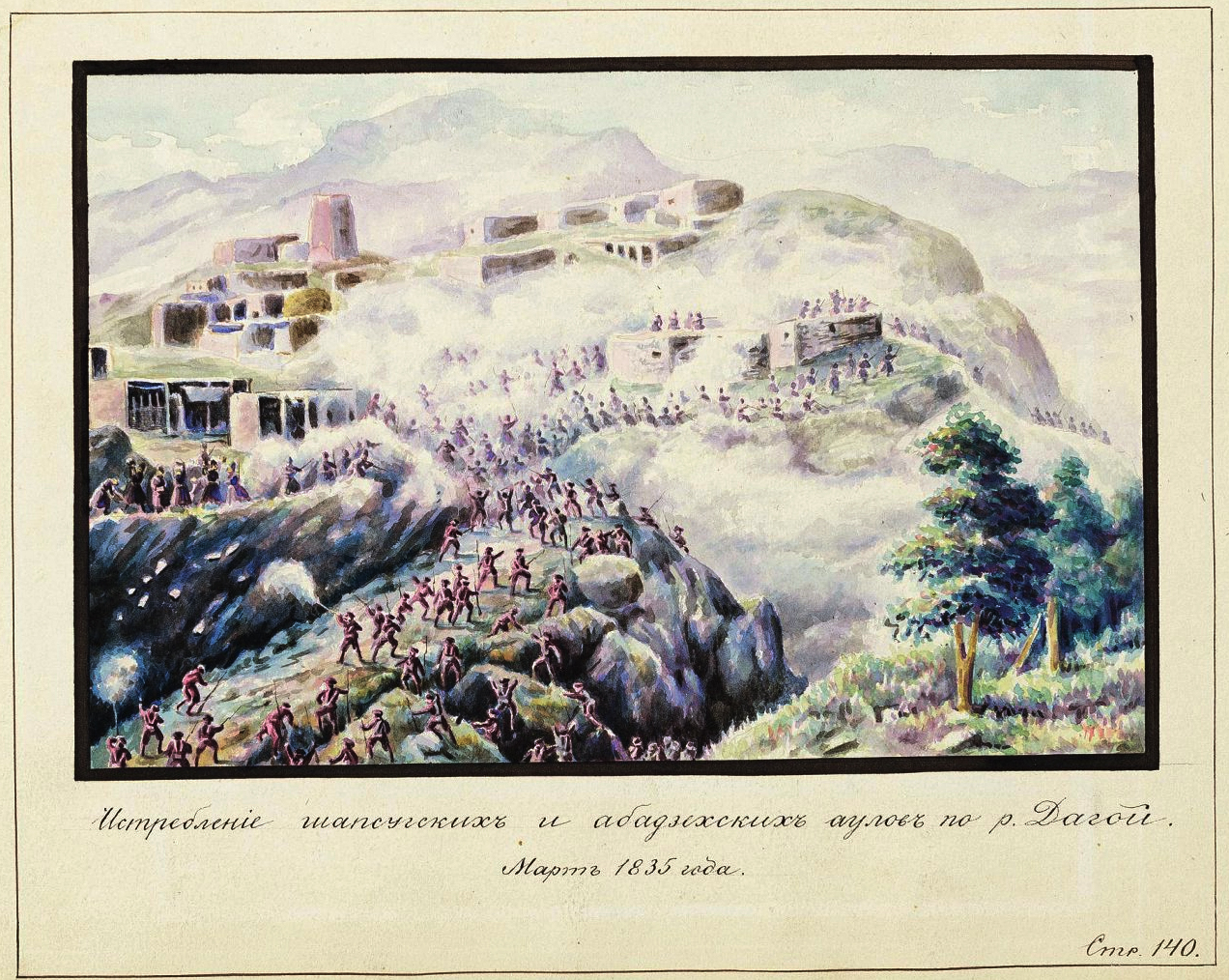
Destruction of Shapsug and Abzakh villages along the Dagoy River. March 1835.

He then talks about how he destroyed a neighborhood:

The savages panicked and started fleeing from their homes, leaving their weapons behind attempting to escape to the forest but most of them were killed by the Cossacks ... with the soldiers lined up ready to fight, the cleansing continued with artillery shells, and I sent there two infantry brigades, but they could only capture 11 more people, and since the fire was in flames in many places, the rest were either killed or burned after attempting to escape by hiding on the roofs of their homes or by the manure. So like this, we destroyed and destructed the neighborhood.

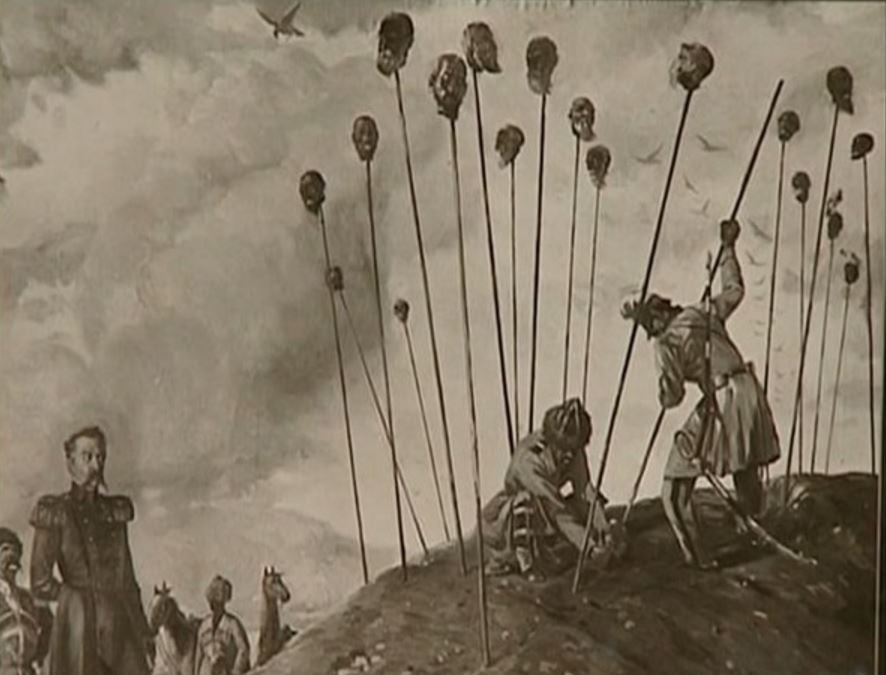
"Russian troops eagerly hoisting pikes spitted with the heads of fallen Circassians, with Russian general Grigory Zass savouring the gruesome act" by Nikolay Ivanovich Lorer

Reportedly, Zass would pick random Circassian males from the towns he attacked and burn them alive as a form of entertainment. He did not stop at burning women; he also cut the pregnant women's bellies with a bayonet. He sent severed Circassian heads to friends in Berlin who were professors and used them to study anatomy. The Decemberist Nikolai Ivanovich Lorer said that Zass cleaned and boiled the flesh off the heads after storing them under his bed in his tent. He also had Circassian heads outside of his tent impaled on lances on a hill. Circassian men's corpses were decapitated by Russian-Cossack women on the battlefield after the battles were over for the heads to be sent to Zass for collection. Zass allowed his soldiers to rape Circassian girls.

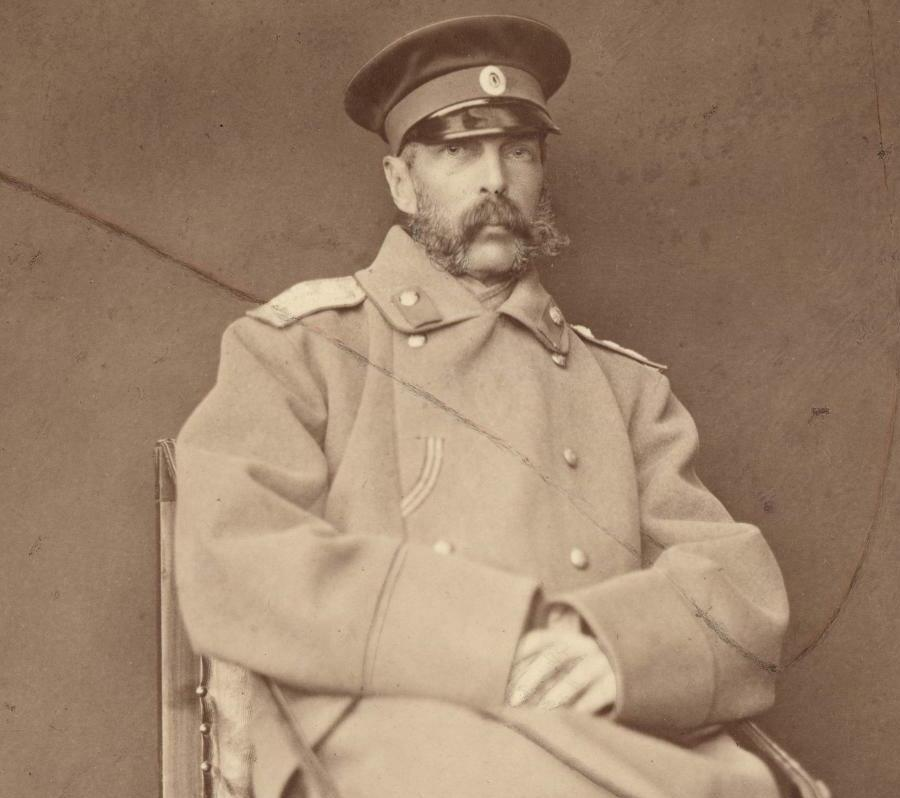
Russian Tsar Alexander II officially approved the expulsion campaign of Circassians. In 1861, he further ordered the large-scale establishment of Russian Christian settlements in Circassian lands.

Zass erected Circassian heads on poles outside of his tent, and witnesses reported seeing wind blowing the beards. Russian soldiers and Cossacks were paid for sending Circassian heads to General Zass. Besides cutting Circassian heads off and collecting them, Zass employed a deliberate strategy of annihilating Circassians en masse, burning entire Circassian villages with the people in them and encouraging violation of Circassian women and children. Zass is depicted as the Devil or Satan in Circassian folklore. In 1842, Zass was removed from service due to his methods being deemed too cruel by St. Petersburg.

In 1837, some Circassian leaders offered the Russians a white peace, arguing that no more blood should be shed. In response to this offer, the Russian army under the command of General Yermolov burnt 36 Circassian villages.

In the negotiations to formulate the 1856 Treaty of Paris, the British representative, the Earl of Clarendon, defended the Circassians' rights, but was thwarted. The final treaty also extended amnesty to nationals that had fought for enemy powers, but since Circassia had never previously been under Russian control, Circassians were exempt, and thus Circassians were now placed under de jure Russian sovereignty by the treaty, with Russia under no compulsion to grant Circassians the same rights as Russian citizens elsewhere, effectively making them Russian property with which Russia could do whatever it wanted.

== Genocide and ethnic cleansing: 1860s ==
"The state needed the Circassians' land, but had absolutely no need of them."

— Military historian Rostislav Fadeyev summarising Russian policy towards Circassians

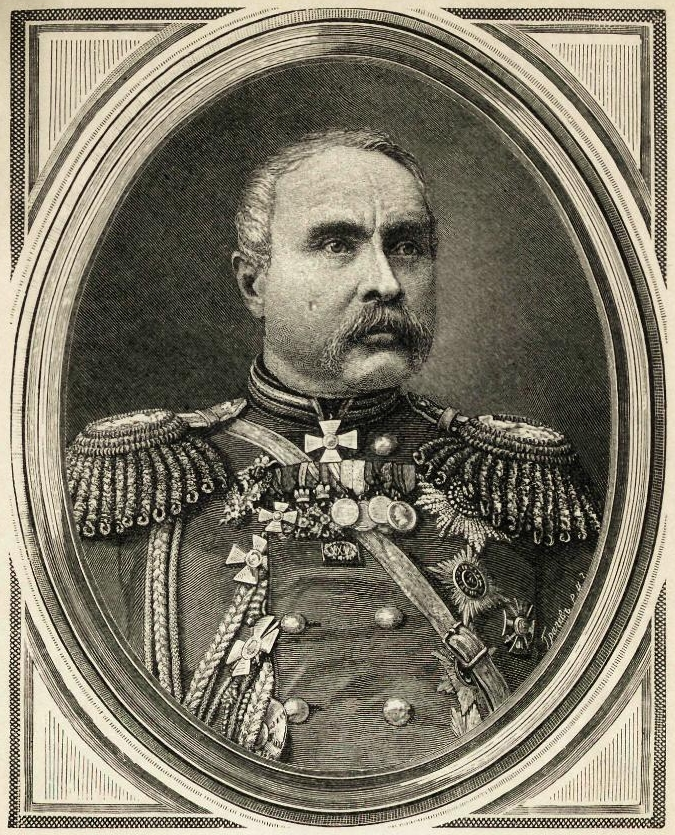
Russian general Count Nikolay Yevdokimov organized the operations of massacres and extermination of Circassian populations during the Russian military campaign.

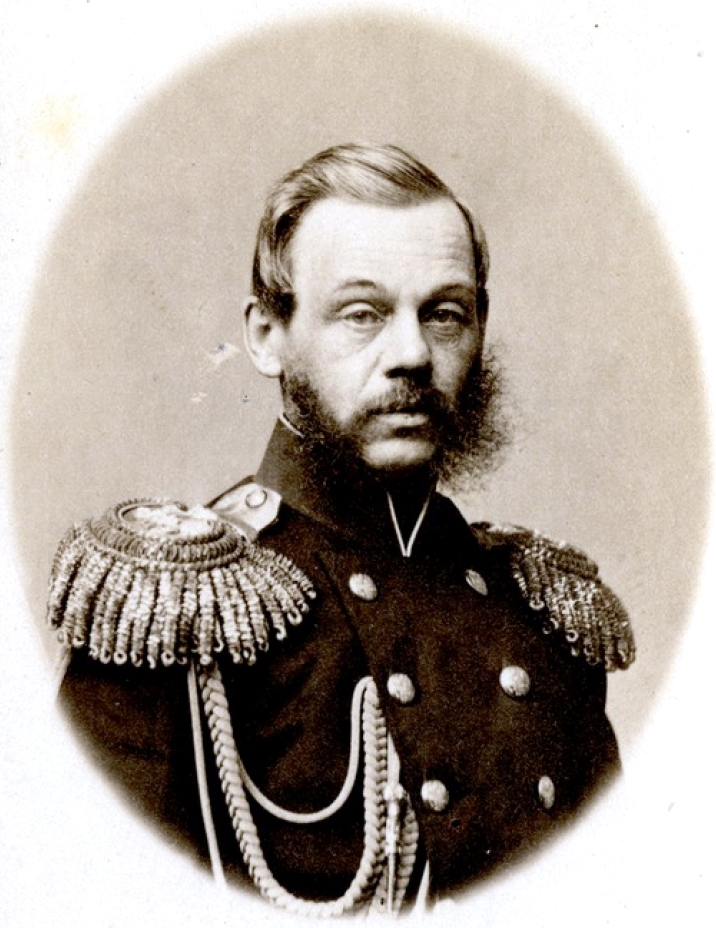
Dmitry Milyutin, 1865

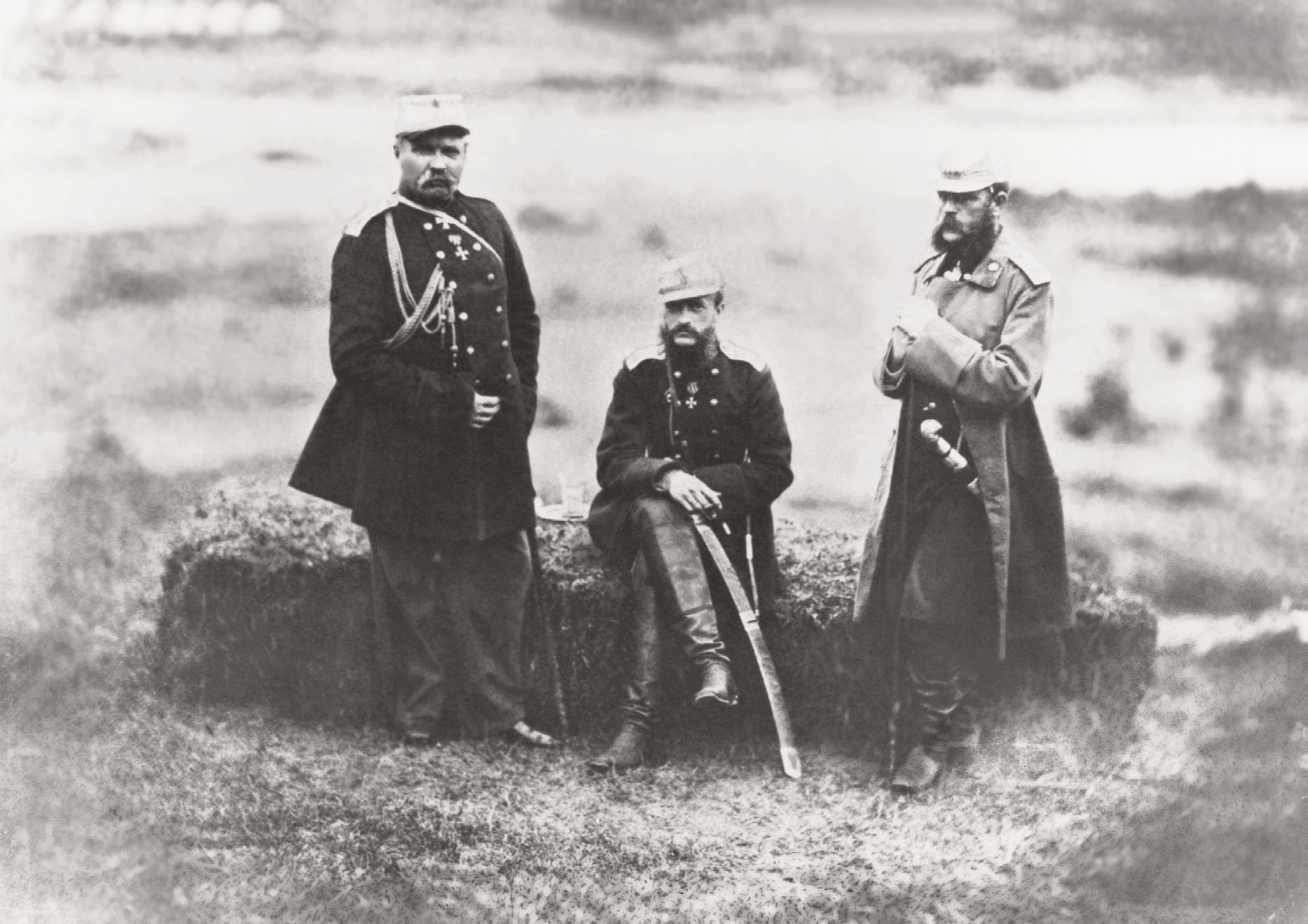
Commanders of Russian troops in the Western Caucasus: Infantry General Count Nikolai Yevdokimov (left), Governor of the Caucasus and Grand Duke Mikhail Nikolayevich (centre), and Major General D. I. Svyatopolk-Mirsky (right) at Qbaada, 21 May 1864.

Genocides and mass expulsions of Caucasian natives and Crimean Tatars were perpetrated by the Russian empire during the latter half of 19th century as it expanded southwards and launched extermination campaigns against Circassians, Chechens, Crimean Tatars, and others. Pogroms against Jews also intensified across the Russian empire during this period. These extermination campaigns were part of Tsarist Russia's settler-colonial policy of Russification deemed brosok na yug (бросок на юг; 'push to the south', lit. 'throw to the south') in the Caucasus and surrounding regions. Following the Crimean war, the Russian empire forcibly expelled millions of Crimean Tatars and sent Russian settlers to the Crimean peninsula. During the 1860s, the Russian imperial army conquered Circassia and launched a scorched-earth campaign of state terror aimed at the extermination or complete expulsion of all Circassians from the Caucasus region.

In 1857, Dmitry Milyutin published the idea of expelling the Circassians en masse. Milyutin argued that the goal was not to simply move them so that their land could be settled by productive farmers, but rather that "eliminating the Circassians was to be an end in itself – to cleanse the land of hostile elements". Tsar Alexander II endorsed the plans to exterminate the Circassians, and in June 1861 ordered the launch of a settler-colonial Russification and Christianization programme. Milyutin was later appointed as Minister of War that same year, and from the early 1860s onward, massacres and ethnic cleansing became regular occurrences in the Caucasus.

Others among the Russian military class such as Rostislav Fadeyev characterized the Circassians as a "barbaric people", additionally expressing his view that they were incapable of being Russified. Fadeyev argued that a "re-education of a people is a centuries-long process" and claimed that Russia was at a pivotal moment in its history towards the total assimilation of the Caucasus region into the Russian empire. Fadeyev supported the extermination of half the population, stating that Russians intended to "exterminate half the Circassian people in order to compel the other half to lay down their arms". Sentiments for expulsion existed among prominent Russian politicians such as Prince Kochubei. Kochubei said to Americans visiting the region that "these Circassians are just like your American Indians – as untamable and uncivilized ... and, owing to their natural energy of character, extermination only would keep them quiet."

As Russian armies advanced in Circassia in the late 1850s and early 1860s, Circassians were evicted from their lands so they could be settled by loyal Cossacks as the Russian military elite developed a belief that Circassians would have to be entirely expelled from regions for the security of Russian rule. Yermolov wrote that "resettlement of intractable mountaineers" to Turkey would be the easiest way to "give freedom" to those who "prefer death to allegiance to the Russian government". The Circassian resettlement plan was eventually agreed upon at a meeting of the Russian Caucasus commanders in October 1860 in Vladikavkaz and officially approved on 10 May 1862 by Tsar Alexander II and a flood of refugee movements began as Russian troops advanced in their final campaign.

Although the order given by Tsar Alexander II was to deport the Circassians rather than to massacre them, the Russian commanders instead preferred the idea of massacring large portions of the Circassian population. Richmond has noted that "reports abound" of massacres in the final stages of the Caucasus campaign.

In 1859, three years before the approval of the plan by the Russian government, Russian officials began talks with the Ottomans about the migration of a limited number of emigrants, and in 1860 the two sides negotiated a treaty for the migration of 40,000–50,000 Circassians, with the Ottoman side being eager for an increase in population. However, Russia did not aim to limit the number of exiles to 50,000, as the plan was to exile the entire Circassian population.

With a gathering sense of emergency, on 25 June 1861, leaders of all the Circassian tribes gathered in Sochi to jointly petition the Western powers for help. Ottoman and British delegations both promised recognition of an independent Circassia, as well as recognition from Paris, if they unified into a coherent state, and in response the Circassian tribes formed a national parliament in Sochi, but Russian General Kolyobakin quickly overran Sochi and destroyed it, while there was no action to stop this by any major power's government.

Russian geographer Mikhail Ivanovich Venyukov, who was co-operating with Russian military at that time for cartographic purposes; was shocked by Yevdokimov's plans for exterminating the Circassians and other natives. In his memoirs, Venyukov reported that Count Yevdokimov pursued all means to sabotage communications between the Emperor and native tribal chiefs; since he was determined to expel all the inhabitants from the region. Describing Count Yevdokimov's strategy of inflicting state terror and mass-starvations on Circassian tribes, Adolf Berzhe reports:

Evdokimov's plan was to base the conquest of the western Caucasus on the Kuban Caucasus Army, and by means of military lines and new settlements continually pressure the mountain tribes until it became completely impossible for them to live in the mountains.

In April 1862, a group of Russian soldiers slaughtered hundreds of Circassians who had run out of ammunition, leaving "the mountain covered with corpses of bayoneted enemies", as reported by Ivan Drozdov. He tried to justify the extensive death and destruction that his army brought upon the Circassians: "Mankind has rarely experienced such disasters and to such extremes, but only horror could have an effect on the hostile mountaineers and drive them from the impenetrable mountain thickets." For the most part, the Imperial Russian army preferred to indiscriminately destroy areas where Circassians resided. In September 1862, after attacking a Circassian village and seeing some of its inhabitants flee into the forest, General Nikolay Yevdokimov bombarded that forest for six hours and ordered his men to kill on sight; he then set the forest on fire to make sure no survivors were left.

"The war was conducted with implacable, merciless severity. We went forward step by step, irrevocably cleansing the mountaineers to the last man from any land the soldiers set foot on. The mountaineers' auls were burned by the hundreds, just as soon as the snow melted but before the leaves returned to the trees (in February and March). We trampled and destroyed their crops with our horses. If we were able to capture the villagers by surprise we immediately sent them via convoy to the shore of the Black Sea, and farther, to Turkey...there were atrocities bordering on barbarity"

— Russian geographer Mikhail Ivanovich Venyukov describing the brutality of massacres against Circassians

Drozdov reported to have overheard numerous Circassian men taking oaths to fight the heavy artillery forces; so as to allow their family and rest of their villages to escape, and later more reports of groups of Circassians doing so were received. Leo Tolstoy reported that Russian soldiers would attack village houses at night.

In October 1862, Yevdokimov ordered the de-population and mass-expulsion of all Circassians from Caucasus. By the fall of 1863, Russian operations had become methodical, following a formula by which, after the Circassians fled into the woods, their village and any food that could be found would be burned, then after a week or two they would search for and destroy any huts the Circassians might have made for shelter, burn the forest, and then this process would be repeated until General Yevdokimov was satisfied that all the natives in the area had died either by being shot, starved, or burned. By this period, the combat phase of the war was over; and Russian military forces were simply engaging in systematic massacres, torture and de-population of unarmed civilians, women and children.

In the southeast, Circassians prepared to resist and hold their last stand against Russian military advances and troops. With the refusal to surrender, Circassian tribes were targeted one by one by the Russian military, with thousands massacred and whole villages razed to the ground.

On April 9, 1864, "A Petition from Circassian leaders to Her Majesty Queen Victoria" was signed by the Circassians. The document requested British military aid, or at least humanitarian aid, for the Circassian people. It reads:

In the name of God, the Most Compassionate, the Most Merciful.

Our most humble Petition to Her Magnificent Majesty the Queen and Emperor of England is to the effect that –

It is now more than eighty years since the Russian Government is unlawfully striving to subdue and annex to its dominions Circassia, which since the creation of the world has been our home and our country. It slaughters like sheep the children, helpless women, and old men that fall into its hands. It rolls about their heads with the bayonet like melons, and there is no act of oppression or cruelty which is beyond the pale of civilisation and humanity, and which defies description, that it has not committed.

We have not, from father to son, at the cost of our lives and properties, refrained from opposing the tyrannical acts of that Government in defence of our country, which is dearer to us than our lives. But during the last year or two it has taken advantage of a famine caused by a drought with which the Almighty visited us, as well as by its own ravages, and it has occasioned us great distress by its severe attacks by sea and land. Many are the lives which have been lost in battle, from hunger in the mountains, from destitution on the sea-coast, and from want of skill at sea.

We therefore invoke the mediation and precious assistance of the British Government and people – the guardian of humanity and centre of justice – in order to repel the brutal attacks of the Russian Government on our country, and save our country and our nation together.

But if it is not possible to afford this help for the preservation of our country, and race, then we pray to be afforded facilities for removing to a place of safety our helpless and miserable children and women that are perishing by the brutal attacks of the enemy as well as by the effects of famine; and if neither of these two requests are taken into consideration, and if in our helpless condition we are utterly annihilated notwithstanding our appeals to the mercy and grace of the Governments, then we shall not cease to invoke our right in the presence of the Lord of the Universe, of Him who has confided to Your Majesty sovereignty, strength, and power for the purpose of protecting the weak.

We beg Your Excellency [Sir Henry Bulwer] to be the medium of making known to the great British Government and to the glorious British nation our condition of helplessness and misery, and we have therefore ventured to present to Your Excellency our most humble petition. A copy of it has been submitted to the Sultan's Government and to the Embassies of other Powers.

Signed by the People of Circassia. 29 Sheval, 1280 [April 7, 1864]

In 1864, in the valley of Khodz near Maikop, the Ubykh population resisted Russian troops. During the battle, the men were joined by women, who disposed of their jewellery into the river and took up arms into a fight to the end. As part of Yevdokimov's strategy, Russian Imperial Army blocked all exitways and bombarded the valley from all directions with heavy artillery, indiscriminately killing men, women and children for several days. Russians troops with heavy artillery and other modern weaponry killed all the men, women and children, in a scene that a Circassian chronicler Shauket who had witnessed the events described as "a sea of blood". Describing his account of the mass-murder in the valley, Shauket outlined:

"men and women were slaughtered mercilessly and blood flowed in rivers, so that it was said that the 'bodies of the dead swam in a sea of blood'. Nevertheless, the Russians were not content with what they had done but sought to satisfy their instincts by making children targets for their cannon shells

Another chronicler reported that all living inhabitants of Khodz valley were slaughtered by Russian military assaults and bombardments. In March 1864, a surrounded Circassian army refused to surrender and committed mass suicide. Around the same time, a final battle took place in Qbaada in 1864 between the Circassian army of 20,000 men and women, consisting of local villagers and militia and a Russian army of 100,000 men, consisting of Cossack and Russian horsemen, infantry and artillery. The Circassians were defeated, and after the battle, masses of Circassians were driven to Sochi, where thousands died as they awaited deportation.

The last Circassian resistance, along with the coastal tribes of Pskhu, Akhtsipsou, Aibgo and Jigit were defeated and then killed en masse to the last man, woman and child, after which, on 21 May, Prince Mikhail Nikolayevich gathered the troops in a clearing in the area for a thanksgiving service. The Russian army began celebrating victory, as a military-religious parade was held, and 100 Circassian warriors were publicly mutilated in a public execution in order to establish authority. After this, the Russian army began increasing their efforts in raiding and burning Circassian villages, destroying fields to prevent return, cutting down trees, and driving the people to the Black Sea coast.

In this year of 1864 a deed has been accomplished almost without precedent in history: not one of the mountaineer inhabitants remains on their former places of residence, and measures are being taken to cleanse the region in order to prepare it for the new Russian population.

— Main Staff of the Caucasian Army

The Ottomans hoped to increase the proportion of Muslims in regions where there were large Christian populations. Mountaineers were invited to "go to Turkey, where the Ottoman government would accept them with open arms and where their life would be incomparably better".

General Yevdokimov was entrusted with enforcing the Russian policy of mass Circassian migration to other parts of the Russian Empire or the Ottoman Empire. Although some Circassians went by land to the Ottoman Empire, the majority went by sea, and those tribes which had "chosen" deportation were marched to the ports along the Black Sea by Russian forces. Russian commanders and governors warned that if the order to leave was not carried out, more forces would be sent.

=== Conditions during the deportation process ===
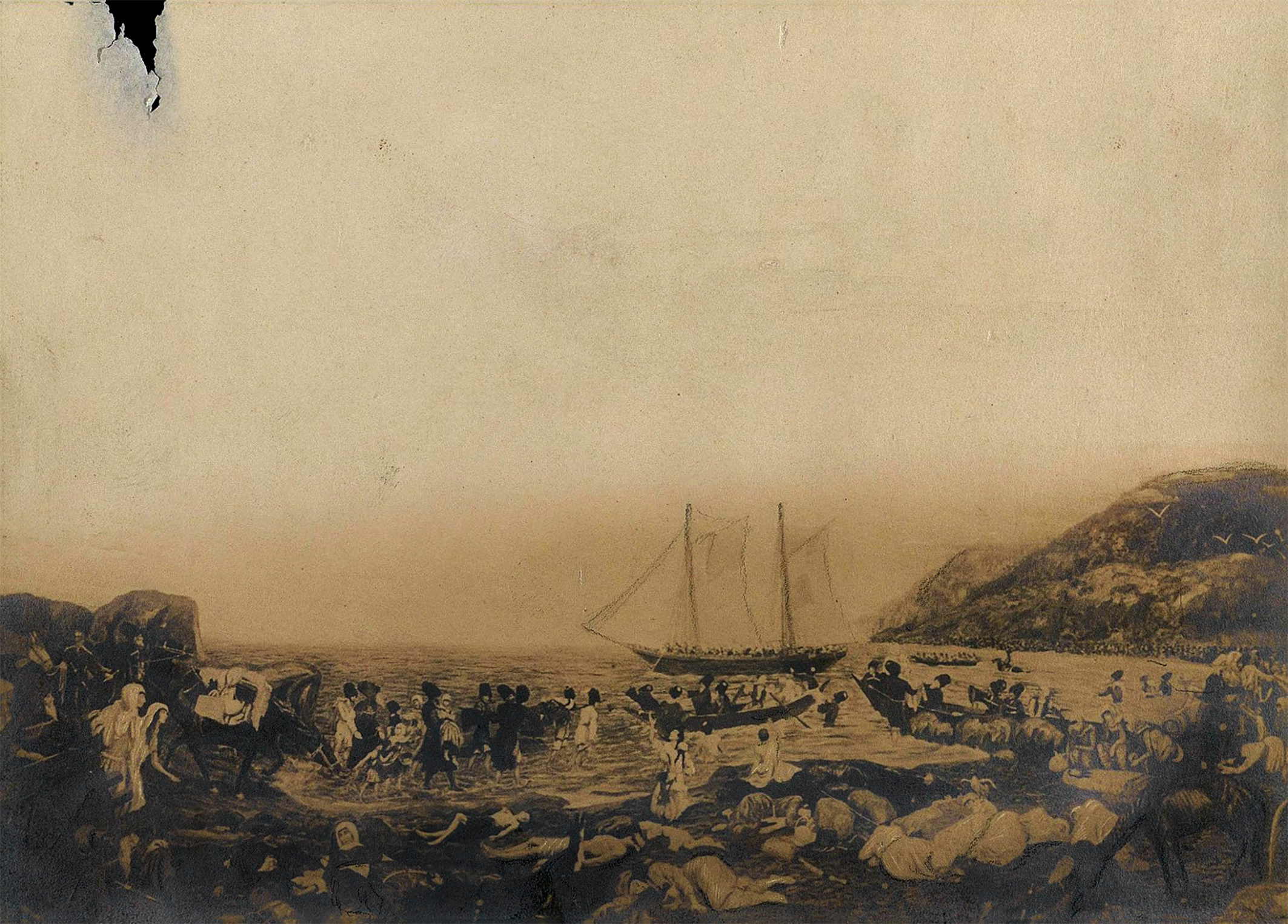
A Circassian Camp Near Novorossiysk, 1864.

The situation of the Circassian masses that had been driven into the coastal gorges prior to transport was dire. A Russian historian of the time, Adolph Petrovich Berzhe, who witnessed the events regarding the departure of the Circassians described the following:

I shall never forget the overwhelming impression made on me by the mountaineers in Novorossiysk Bay, where about seventeen thousand of them were gathered on the shore. The late, inclement and cold time of the year, the almost complete absence of means of subsistence and the epidemic of typhus and small pox raging among them made their situation desperate. And indeed, whose heart would be touched on seeing, for example, the already stiff corpse of a young Circassian woman lying in rags on the damp ground under the open sky with two infants, one struggling in his death-throes while the other sought to assuage his hunger at his dead mother's breast? And I saw not a few such scenes.

— Adolph Petrovich Berzhe, Ahmed 2013, pp. 162–163.

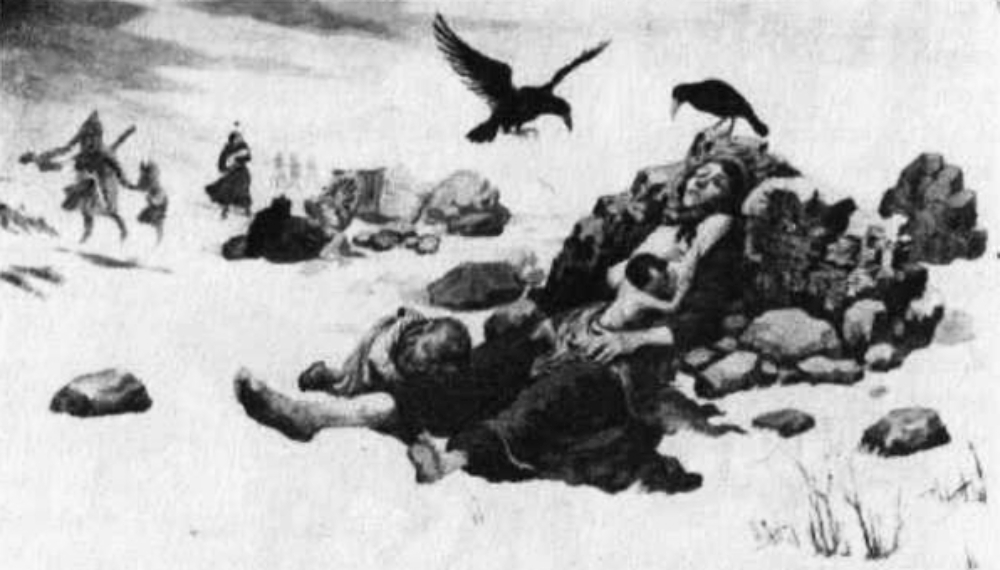
Depiction of civilian mortality during the exile, preserved at ARIGI.

Ivan Drozdov, a Russian officer who witnessed the scene in May 1864 as the other Russians were celebrating their victory remarked:

On the road our eyes were met with a staggering image: corpses of women, children, elderly persons, torn to pieces and half-eaten by dogs; deportees emaciated by hunger and disease, almost too weak to move their legs, collapsing from exhaustion and becoming prey to dogs while still alive.

— Ivan Drozdov

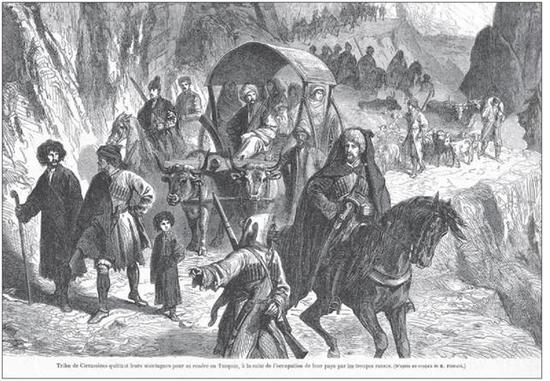
Circassian refugees

An unknown number of deportees perished during the process. Some died from epidemics among crowds of deportees both while awaiting departure and while languishing in their Ottoman Black Sea ports of arrival. Others perished when ships underway sank during storms or due to cases where profit-minded transporters overloaded their ships to maximize profit. To pay for the voyage, Circassians sometimes were forced to sell their cattle, belongings, or even themselves into slavery.

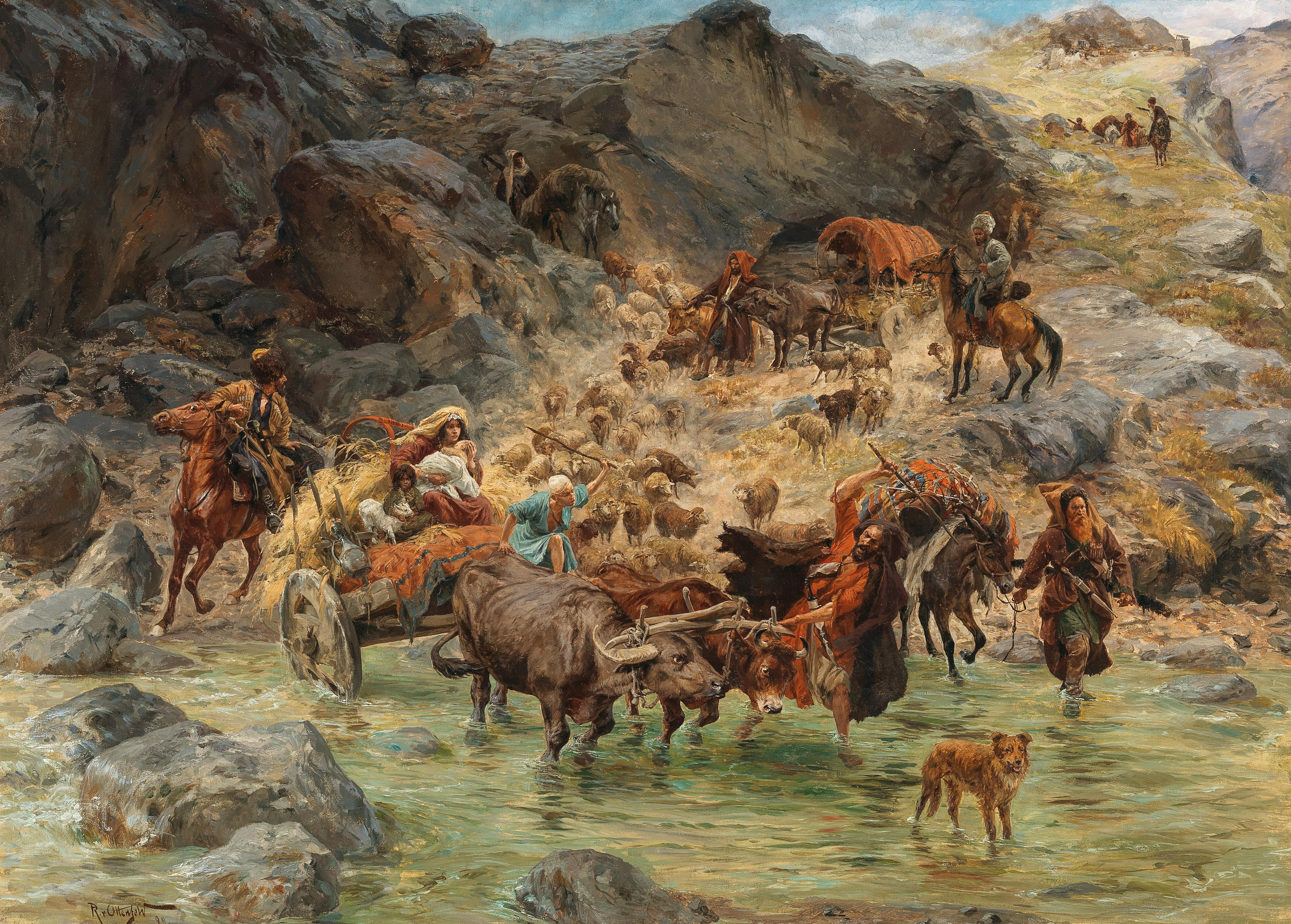
Orientalist painting depicting Circassians leaving their villages, painted by Rudolf Otto von Ottenfeld, 1890.

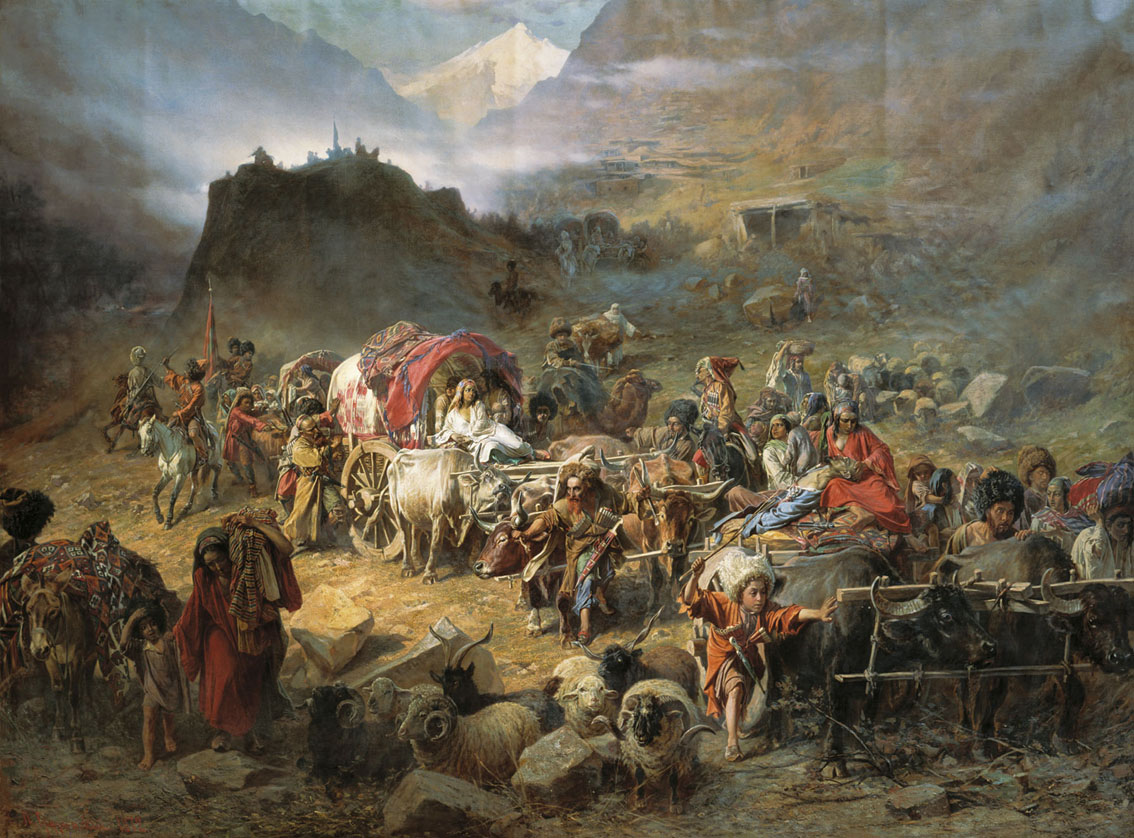
Orientalist painting depicting Circassians trying to evacuate their town in order to avoid being massacred, painted by Pyotr Gruzinsky, 1872.

The operation was not done with any degree of efficiency by the Russians, forcing the Circassians typically to leave using unchartered vessels, thus opening themselves up to abuses by the captains of such vessels. In some cases as many as 1,800 refugees were packed into one ship, which would also carry livestock and household possessions. When the ships did not sink, such crowded environments proved suitable for the spread of diseases and dehydration, and when the ships arrived at their destinations, they contained only remnants of their original human cargo. For this reason, they were referred to by contemporary observers as "floating graveyards" with "decks swarming with the dead and dying".

Abuses in the transport of refugees between Turkish cities were also noted, with one particular incident concerning a ship bound for Cyprus in which mutilated and decapitated bodies were found washed ashore, compounded by accounts of refugees being tied up and tossed overboard while still alive. On this particular Cyprus-bound ship, only one third of the refugees who had boarded survived. Another Russian observer, Olshevsky, also noted abuses by Turkish skippers, as well as bribes paid by Circassians to get onto departing ships, but he blamed most of all the Russian command under Yevdokimov for the situation:

Why did it happen that ... the Abzakhs and Shapsugs, who were being driven from their homeland, suffered such horrific sufferings and deaths? It was exclusively because of the hurried and premature movement of our troops to the sea prior to the spring equinox. Had the Dakhovsky Detachment moved a month or two weeks later, this would not have happened.

Despite the conditions, Russian forces under Yevdokimov kept driving Circassians to the coast. In January he annihilated Ubykh villages, leaving the Ubykhs without shelter in the severe winter, and in March, the crowd of refugees at the Circassian port of Tuapse approached twenty thousand.

Only a portion of those who had left the Circassian coast actually made it to Ottoman ports. Of the portion that made it to Ottoman shores, many more would die there soon after while they were quarantined on either beach, the vessels that had carried them, or in lazarettos, and many more died in makeshift accommodations or in the process of being transported a second time to their final destinations. One British eyewitness recalled that:

Dense masses of ragged men, women, and children literally covered the seashore. All looked wan and hungry. Many were all but naked. Several lay dying.

In 1864, the Ottoman Porte repeatedly asked the Russian government to stop the deportations on humanitarian grounds, in light of the human disaster unfolding on their shores, but the Ottoman requests were repeatedly refused, as Yevdokimov argued with urgency that the deportations should instead be accelerated. When October 1864 was chosen as a cutoff point for the departures, Yevdokimov successfully postponed it two weeks, after which he ignored the deadline and deported Circassians without stop, even as winter set in again. Later in 1867, Grand Prince Mikhail Nikolaevich stated that the cleansing had had to be accelerated "in light of a possible European coalition".

=== Transport vessels ===
As Russia made it clear that it would not try hard to keep deported Circassians alive, and provide few ships for the effort, the Ottomans sent their navy to carry the Circassians. As the deportations increased, there were not enough Ottoman vessels to carry all the deportees, even when warships were recruited for the job, and the situation began taking a heavy toll on the Ottoman treasury, as it bore the brunt of the cost.

Initially, on 17 May 1863, Tsar Alexander II ruled that those who "chose" to emigrate should pay their own way. Later, the Russians offered financial incentives for vessels to take the Circassians to Ottoman ports, but forced the Circassians themselves to pay. In some cases, Circassians were forced to sell their cattle or their belongings to pay; in others, one of every thirty Circassians were sold into slavery to pay. These funds ultimately ended up in the hands of the transporters, including Russian military officiers. Many vessels refused to carry Circassians because of the disease that was present among them as many of the ships that had been carrying Circassians had had their crews fall ill, while others that did agree tried to make as much profit out of it as possible by overloading their vessels with refugees, ultimately causing many transport boats to sink, killing their human cargo. In April 1864, after one Russian crew was entirely wiped out by disease, Russian vessels stopped offering themselves for transport, dumping the entire process onto the burden of the Ottomans; and Yevdokimov made no effort to make provisions for food, water or medical help.

The Russian consul based in the Ottoman Black Sea port of Trabzon reported the arrival of 240,000 Circassians with 19,000 dying shortly thereafter with the death rate being around 200 people per day.

On 25 May 1864, Henry Bulwer, the British ambassador in Istanbul, argued that the British government charter some of its own vessels for the purpose because the Ottomans simply did not have enough on their own, and innocent civilians would be left to rot; the vessels were not forthcoming but British government ships provided assistance at various points and British steamships also helped. On 29 May, eight Greek vessels were reported to be helping with the transportation of Circassians, as were one Moldavian, one German, and one British vessel.

== Casualties and demographic changes ==
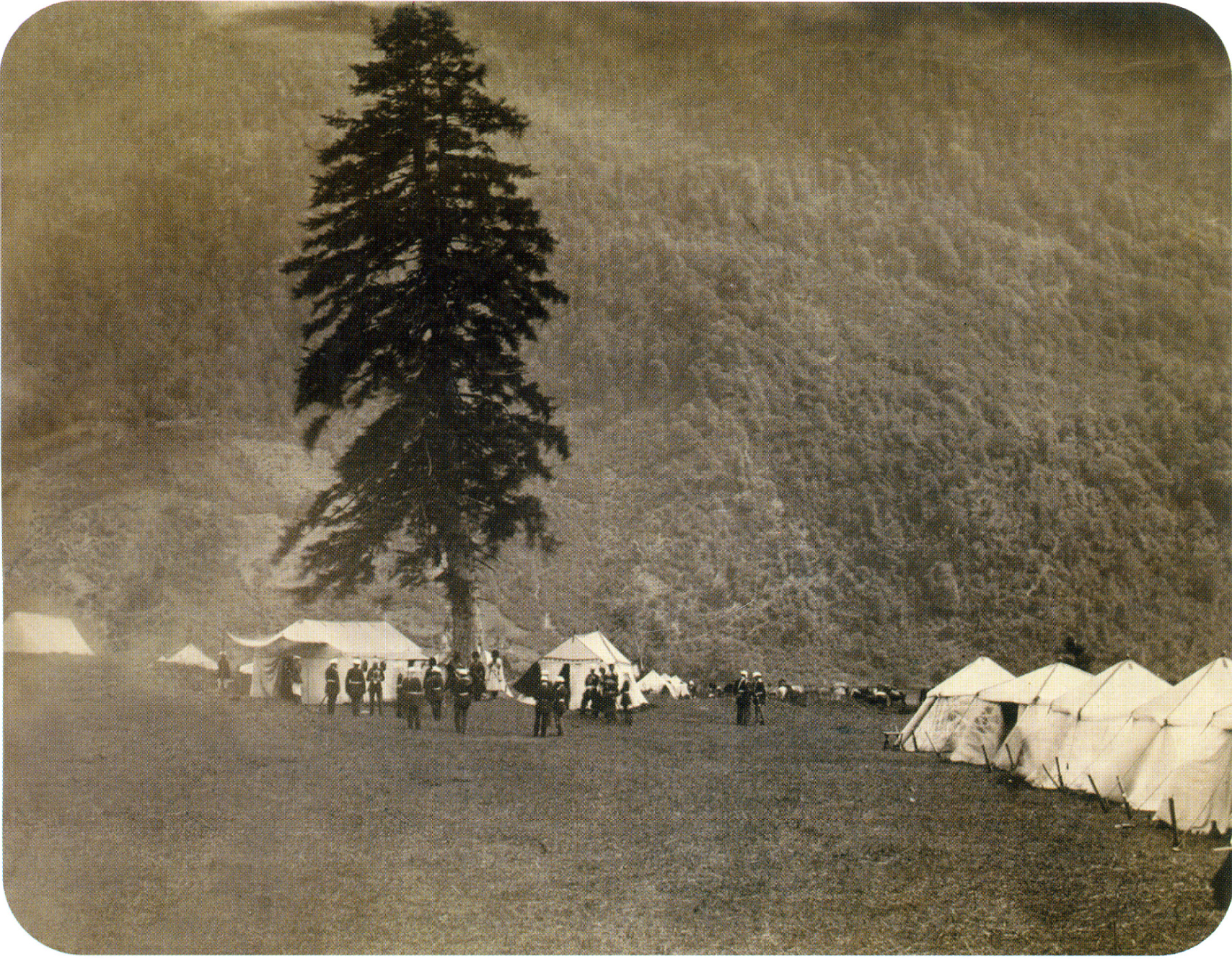
Parade by Russian troops, symbolizing the end of the Caucasian War at a military encampment in Qbaada, 21 May 1864

Circassian genocide is considered to be the deadliest ethnic cleansing campaign, perpetrated by any state, during the 19th century. According to a census conducted in 1830, more than 4 million Circassians lived in their homeland in the Caucasus. Of these, between 1.5 and 2 million Circassians were killed in several massacres, military operations, and large-scale state terror perpetrated by the Russian imperial army during its extermination campaigns in Circassia. Most sources state that as many as 1 to 1.5 million Circassians were forced to flee in total, but only around half of them could make it to land. Ottoman archives show nearly one million migrants entering their land from the Caucasus by 1879, with nearly half of them dying on the shores as a result of diseases. If Ottoman archives are correct, it would make it the biggest genocide of the 19th century, and indeed, in support of the Ottoman archives, the Russian census of 1897 records only 150,000 Circassians, one tenth of the original number, still remaining in the now conquered region. According to Kemal Hasim Karpat: "approximately 2 million Caucasians, mostly Circassians, left Russia in the period from 1859 to 1879 but that only about 1,500,000 actually survived and were settled on Ottoman domains." Justin McCarthy estimates that roughly "400,000" Muslims died during the "Caucasian Expulsion".

The Shapsugh tribe, which had numbered some 300,000, was reduced to the 3,000 people who managed to flee into the forests and plains. The 140 Shapsugh that remained were sent to Siberia. Overall, calculations including those taking into account the Russian government's own archival figures as well as Ottoman figures have estimated a loss of 90%, 94% or 95–97% of the Circassian nation in the process. One of the biggest population changes came in the Circassian capital city of Sochi, which previously had a population of around 100,000, and according to Russian sources, was reduced to 98 after the events.

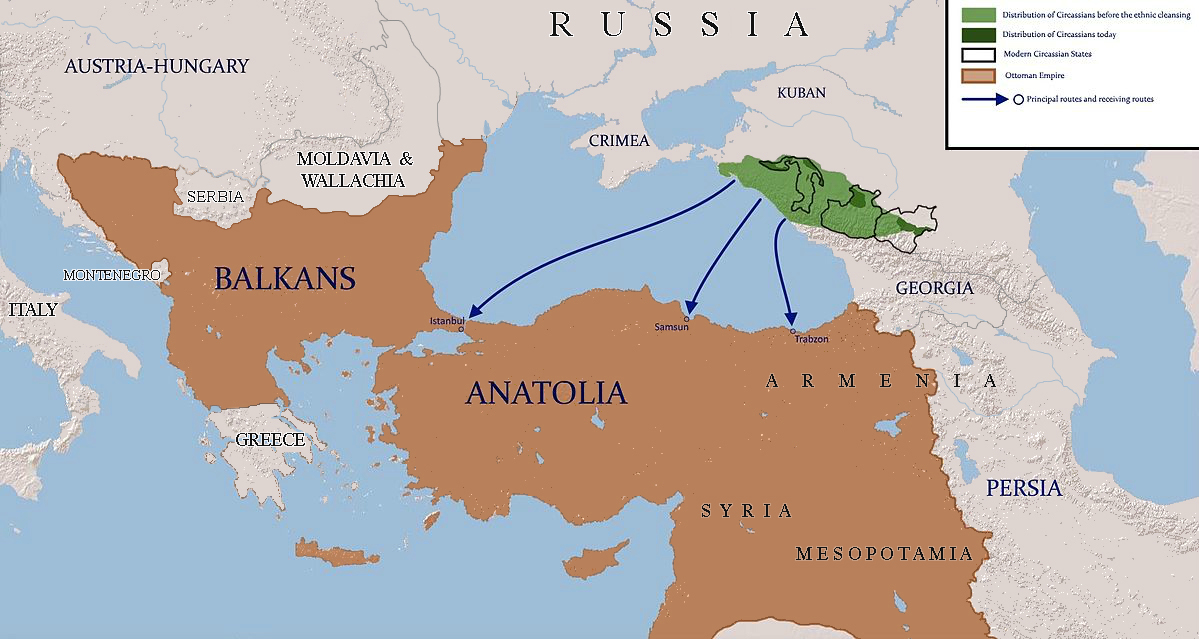
Resettlement of Circassians in the Ottoman Empire

"the cleansing of the latter canyons of natives required a large number of soldiers...
Through all these actions of the Dakhovsky Detachment, the entire mountainous and inaccessible areas between the sources of the Belaya and Pshekha rivers were cleansed of natives.
In order to further squeeze this population and cleanse the land of the natives as much as possible...
on the fifteenth of November three columns advanced to the mouth of the Defan. On the first, second, third and fourth of December several columns went from the source of the Defan along the upper and middle reaches of the rivers annihilating the population, after which, having ascended along the Shapsugo and crossed over into Psekups Basin, they cleansed the left bank of this river of natives."

— Russian general Nikolay Yevdokimov deploying the terms "ochistit" (lit. "to cleanse") and "ochishchenie" (lit. "cleansing") to refer to the massacres and ethnic cleansing of Circassians.

Although Circassians were the main (and most notorious) victims, the expulsions also gravely affected other peoples in the region. It was estimated that 80% of the Ingush left Ingushetia for the Middle East in 1865. In 1865, Tsarist Russia expanded its extermination campaigns against the Chechen people. Lowland Chechens as well were evicted in large numbers, and while many came back, the former Chechen lowlands lacked their historical Chechen populations for a long period until Chechens were settled in the region during the return from their 1944–1957 deportation to Siberia. The Arshtins, at that time a (debatably) separate people, were completely wiped out as a distinct group: according to official documents, 1,366 Arshtin families disappeared (i.e. either fled or were killed) and only 75 families remained. Additionally, in 1860–1861 the Russian army forced a series of evictions of lands in the Central Caucasus, forcing about 10,000 Circassians, 22,000 Chechens and additionally a significant number of Muslim Ossetians out and to Turkey.

Whether sources treat the evictions of these non-Circassian peoples as a part of the same process varies; most sources include the evictions and massacres of the Ubykh (considered by many to be part of the Circassian ethnos despite having a different language) and Abazin populations as part of the same operation against the neighboring ethnic Circassian populations, while others group the expulsions of Chechens, Ingush, Arshtins and Ossetians with those of Kabardins, and also some include the earlier and less systematic expulsions of Nogai. The 1861 order by Yevdokimov to relocate populations of Circassians (including Ubykhs) to the swamps also included the Nogais and Abazas.

Shenfield has argued that those that died in the ensuing catastrophe were probably more than a million, likely approaching 1.5 million. Imperial Russian Army constantly deployed the terms "ochistit" (lit. "to cleanse") and "ochishchenie" (lit. "cleansing") to refer to its military operations that inflicted mass-killings and ethnic cleansing of Circassians. This was part of Russian Empire's settler-colonial policy of expansionism in Caucasus; which involved the de-populating of its inhabitants. The genocide culminated in the deaths and forced expulsions of 95–97% of Circassian natives from Caucasus.

=== Repopulation of affected lands ===
On 25 June 1861, Tsar Alexander II signed an imperial rescript titled "Settlement of the North Caucasus", reading as follows:

Now with God's help, the matter of complete conquest of the Caucasus is near to conclusion. A few years of persistent efforts are remaining to utterly force out the hostile mountaineers from the fertile countries they occupy and settle on the latter a Russian Christian population forever. The honor of accomplishing this deed belongs mainly to the Cossacks of the Kubanski armed forces.

To speed up the process, Alexander offered monetary compensation and various privileges. From the spring of 1861 to 1862, 35 Cossack stanitsas were established, with 5,480 families newly settling the land. In 1864, seventeen new Cossack stanitsas were established in the Transkuban region.

== International reactions ==
=== Ottoman Empire ===
With regard to Ottoman policy overall, Fabio Grassi argues that the Ottoman policy was quite successful with respect to the conditions at hand. He states that the Ottomans saw Circassians as fellow Muslims who were in hard times, but they could not do anything to help them. Rosser-Owen portrays the Ottomans as having been constrained by pragmatic concerns and at a loss for what to do about the flood of refugees, and he notes the hardships suffered by British consular staff as they tried to help the Circassian refugees as well as the improvement of Ottoman policy toward accommodating the refugees over time so that by 1867, when the final refugees were transported, there were many fewer deaths in the process.

Others, however, disagree; historian Walter Richmond accuses the Ottoman government of "playing a double game", "gross irresponsibility" and being "either unconcerned with or oblivious to the consequences immigration would have for the refugees, by having at various points encouraged Circassian population movement", in its previous statements, having earlier encouraged immigration, urging the Circassians to "stay and fight" in late 1863 and promising the arrival of an international coalition force, and then encouraging another wave of immigration as late as June 1864 when the human costs were beyond clear, while Shenfield also describes the Ottoman response to the crisis as "grossly inadequate" and Marc Pinson accuses the Ottoman government of not trying to formulate a coherent policy toward the refugees.

=== United Kingdom ===
Richmond also argues that the British, despite serious discussion of the possibility of military intervention to alleviate the situation in Circassia, were ultimately concerned only with their own geopolitical interests and "deserting" Circassia to its fate. He further argues that Western European indignation at the unfolding situation in Circassia arose only after Russia leveraged the Ottomans to gain special rights in the Dardanelles thus threatening their trade interests.

William Palgrave, a British diplomat who witnessed the events of the genocide, stated regarding the victims that "their only crime was not being Russian".

==== Scotland ====
Rosser-Owen emphasizes that the philanthropic efforts of British organizations and that the concern for the well-being of Circassians was most intense in Scotland where Circassian struggles were compared to past traumas in then-recent Scottish history.

== Advocacy and relief efforts ==
In 1862, the Circassians sent a delegation of leaders to major cities in Britain, which had been covertly helping the Circassians with tactics and with organizing their resistance, visiting major English and Scottish cities including London, Manchester, Edinburgh and Dundee to advocate for their cause. The visits caused a swelling of public support for the Circassians and outrage directed at Russia, with sympathies particularly intense in Scotland perhaps owing to the recent Highland Clearances, and sparked lobbying for intervention by the Dundee Foreign Affairs Committee, calls to arms for the defense of Circassia, the founding of the Circassian Aid Committee in London, and constant reporting on the issue by various newspapers such as The Scotsman.

Politicians and newspapers began taking up the "Circassian cause", and calling for intervention to save Circassia from decimation, and at one point Parliament came close to going to war with Russia and attempting to establish a protectorate over struggling Circassia. Although such initiatives failed to change British government policy, the Circassian Aid Committee, organized by many individuals who were angry at inaction by London, managed to gather £2,067 for the provision of mattresses, blankets, pillows, woolens and clothing especially for Circassian orphans in Istanbul, while Russophobic commentary by some of its members has been attributed for its closing in March 1865. British consuls became involved with relief patterns and the organization of resettlement for Circassians, with various British consuls and consular staff catching illnesses from plague-ridden Circassian refugees, and a few died from such illnesses.

In the initial stages of the process, relief efforts were also made by the Ottoman population, both by Muslims and Christians. In Vidin, in Bulgaria, the Muslim and Christian inhabitants volunteered to increase their grain production and send it to the local Circassian refugees, while in Cyprus, the Muslim population sheltered Circassian orphans. The Ottoman government built mosques for them and provided them with teachers, while the Sultan donated £50,000 from his Privy Purse, although there were some reports in the British press that most of this money did not actually end up helping Circassian refugees, having been embezzled by Ottoman officials at various steps along the way. As the burden of the refugees increased however, sentiments against the refugees, particularly among the Bulgarian and Turkish populations, grew and tensions began to develop between the Bulgarian and Turkish natives and the Circassian refugees.

== Resettlement ==
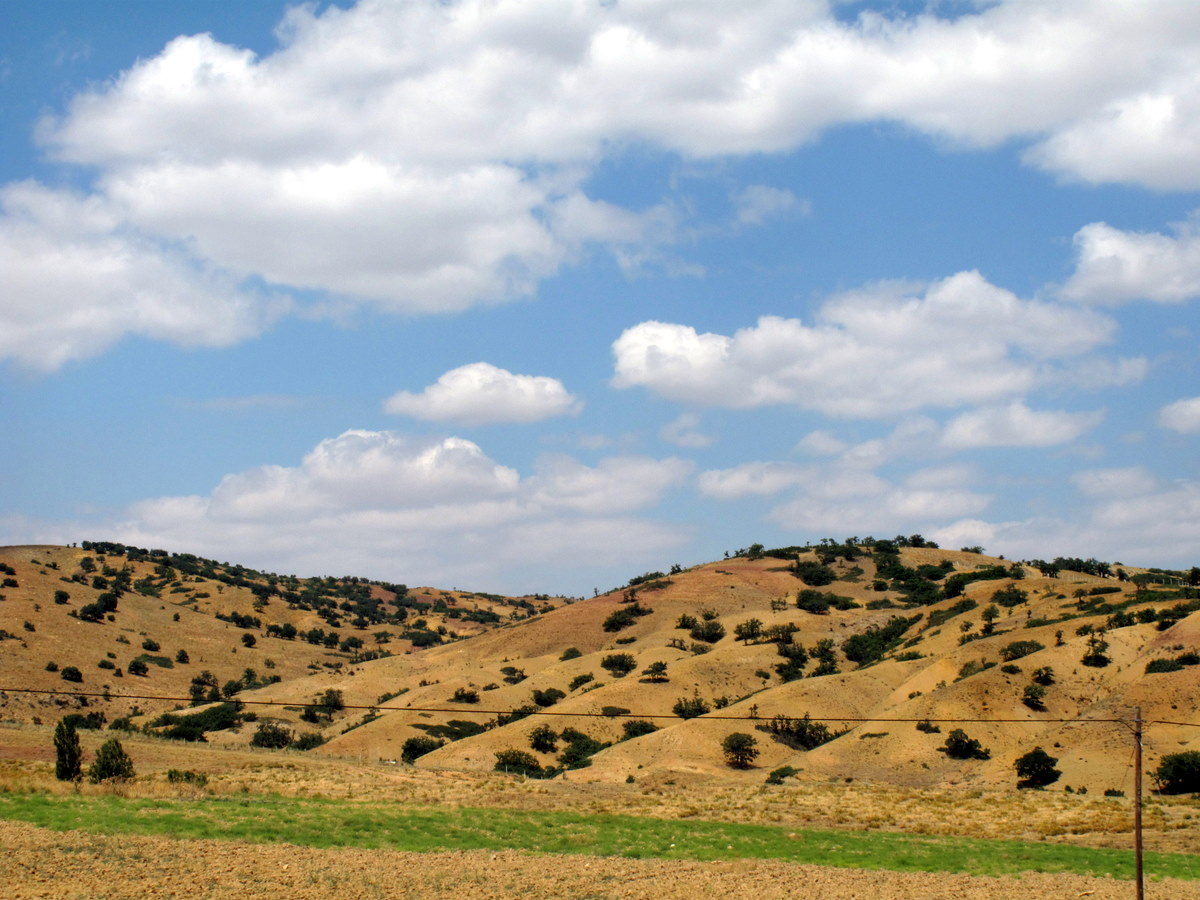
Present-day Inner Anatolia

The Ottoman authorities often failed to offer any support to the newly arrived. They were settled in the inhospitable mountainous regions of Inner Anatolia and were given menial and exhausting jobs. The Russian plans did not include such zealous resettlement to Turkey, according to the decree of Alexander II of May 10, 1862, the Circassians were planned to settle in the Kuban, while allocating a land plot of 6 tithes. Large Circassian landowners, fearing that they might lose their income, provoked all Circassian tribes to move to Turkey.

Imam Shamil's son Muhamed Shafi was appalled by the conditions the migrants had faced upon their arrival to Anatolia and went to investigate the situation:

"I will write to (Turkish sultan) Abdülmecid that he should stop fooling mountaineers ... The government's cynicism could not be more pronounced. The Turks triggered the resettlement by their proclamations, probably hoping to use refugees for military ends ... but after facing the avalanche of refugees, they turned turtle and shamefully condemned to slow death those people who were ready to die for Turkey's glory".

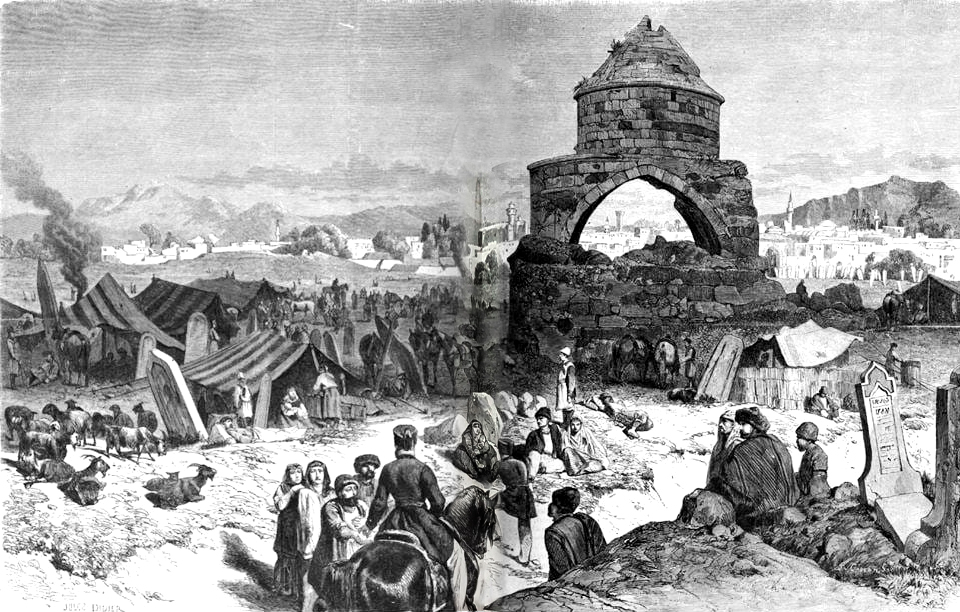
A deportation camp in a cemetery outside the city of Erzurum, 1864.

The Ottoman authorities often opted to settle Circassians in Christian-majority regions that were beginning to clamor for independence, as a loyal counterweight population to the rebellious natives. These places had just recently taken on large numbers of around a hundred thousand Crimean Tatar refugees, in a previous resettlement operation that had also seen widespread complications and problems. In Varna, it was reported that the situation was particularly bad, with 80,000 Circassians settled on the outskirts of the city in "camps of death" where they were unprotected from weather or disease and left without food. When Circassians tried to beg for bread, Turkish soldiers chased them out for fear of the diseases they carried. It was reported that the Turks were unable to keep up with burying Circassian corpses, and recruited convicts to do the work as well; one Circassian wrote to the Governor-General "We rather go to Siberia than live in this Siberia ... one can die, not live, on the indicated place".

In 1864 alone, about 400,000 Circassians fled to Anatolia, Bulgaria and Macedonia, creating a major humanitarian crisis. Many refugees suffered from starvation, disease, and exposure, while outbreaks of smallpox and typhoid also affected local populations. To strengthen the newly established Danube Vilayet, the Ottoman government recruited Circassian and Tatar refugees into military service. Lacking sufficient resources to accommodate the influx, the authorities displaced large numbers of Christian inhabitants from their homes to settle the refugees. In parts of the countryside, violence and insecurity increased, prompting thousands of Christians to flee to Romania and Serbia. The unrest also strengthened the Bulgarian revolutionary movement, undermining Midhat Pasha's efforts to reduce Bulgarian nationalist sentiment.

=== Areas settled by Circassian exiles ===
==== Balkans ====
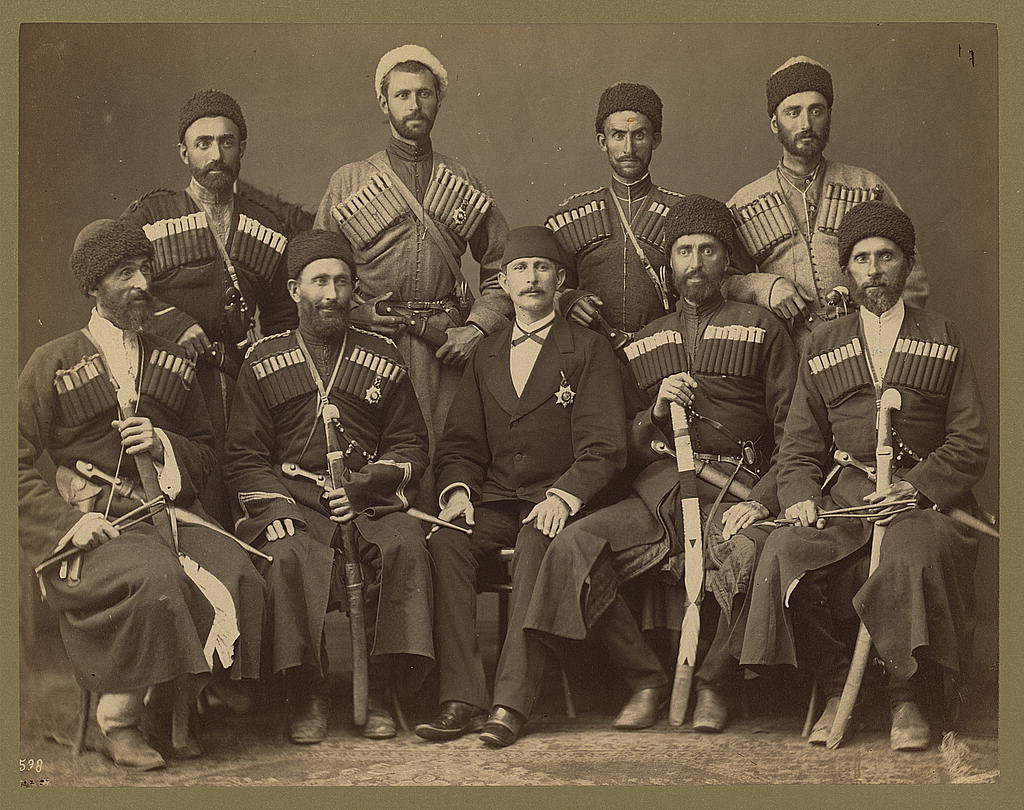
Group portrait of eight Circassian men in Ottoman military uniform, alongside another person sitting in the front center, possibly an Ottoman official. Photo taken sometime between 1880 and 1900 by Ottoman court photographer Abdullah Frères

In 1861–1862 alone, in the Danube Vilayet, there were 41,000 Circassian refugee families. By the end of the process, there were around 250,000 Circassians in the Balkans, accounting for 5 to 7 percent of the total Balkan population, on top of the earlier arrival of 100,000 Crimean Tatars that Balkan populations had just recently had to absorb.

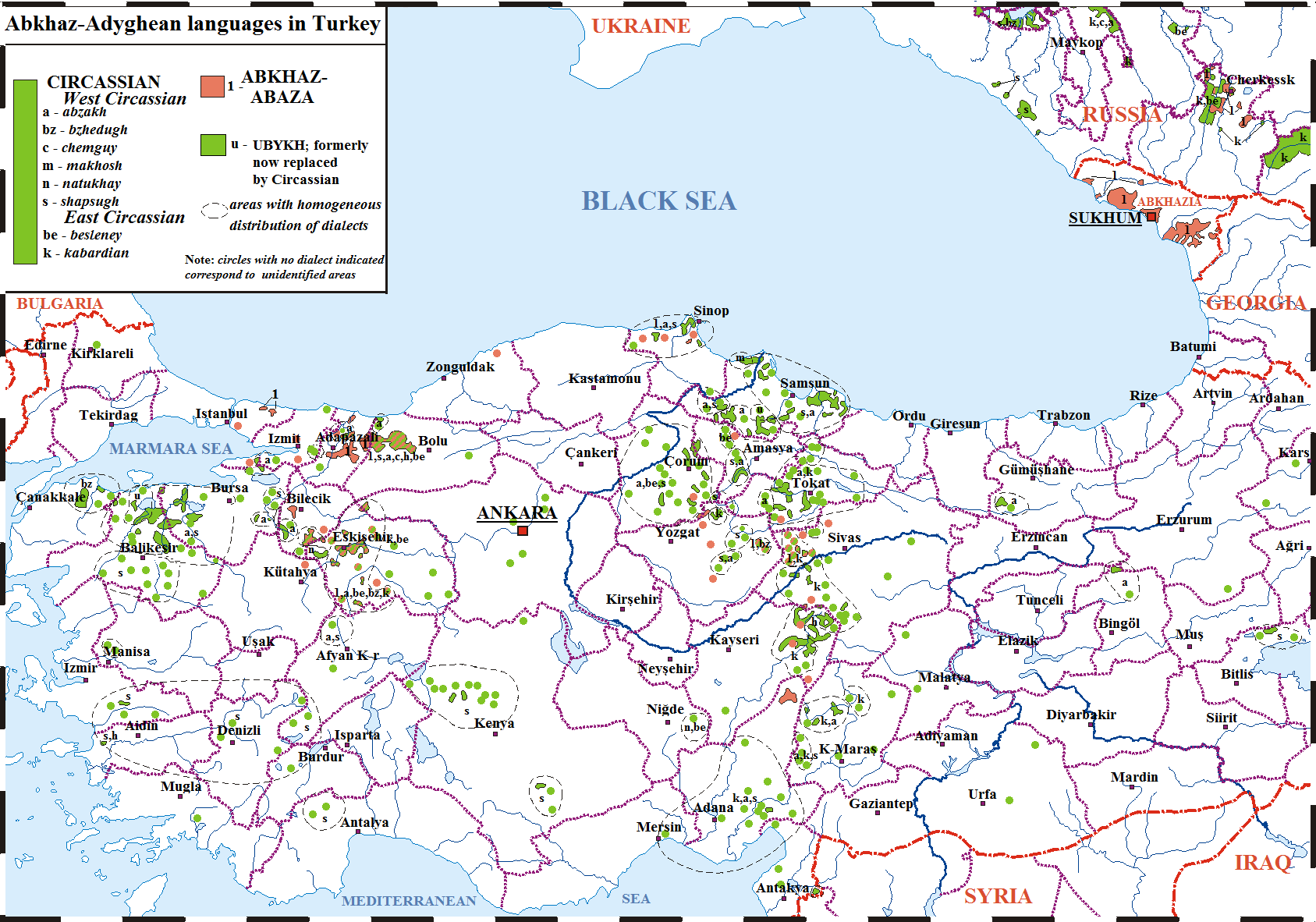
Distribution of Circassian populations in historic Circassia and the diaspora, 21st century

Kadir Natho notes that "a net of Circassian settlements enveloped practically all the European part of the Ottoman Empire". Very large numbers of Circassians were settled in Bulgaria. Istoria Bulgarii reports that "about 6,000 families were transferred through Burgas and settled in Thrace; 13,000 families – through Varna and Shumen – to Silistra and Vidin; 12,000 families to Sofia and Nish. The remainder 10,000 families were distributed in Svishtovsk, Nikipolsk, Oriskhovsk, and other outskirts." There was a chain of Circassian settlements stretching from Dobruja (see Circassians in Romania) to the Serbian border, with an additional cluster of 23 settlements in the Kosovo field. Circassians also settled in a few mostly Greek areas, particularly in the southern part of Epirus, Cyprus and one colony at Panderma in the Sea of Marmara.

Russians raped Circassian refugees who had settled in the Ottoman Balkans "with no regard for age or sex" during the 1877 Russo-Turkish war. Circassian girls were sold into Turkish harems by their relatives. Circassians in the Ottoman army also raped and murdered Bulgarians during the 1877 Russo-Turkish war.

==== Anatolia and Iraq ====
Kadir Natho lists the following areas as having notable concentrations of Circassian refugee settlements: "in spacious Anatolia ... near Amasya, Samsun, Cilicia, Mesopotamia, on the Charshamba peninsula, along the Aegean Sea, in Turkish Armenia, Adapazar, Duzge, Eskisehir, and Balikesir. From Trebizond the mountaineers were directly sent to Kars and Erzincan ... many exiles were distributed in ... the vilayet of Sivas, on the extensive desert between Tokat and Sivas".

== Proposed return ==
Many Circassian households petitioned the Russian embassy in Constantinople (modern-day Istanbul) for their resettlement back in the Caucasus. By the end of the century, the Russian consulates all over the Ottoman Empire were deluged with such petitions. Later, re-emigration was sanctioned only on a limited scale, as mostly large villages (up to 8,500 inhabitants) applied for re-emigration and their relocation posed formidable difficulties to the imperial authorities. Perhaps more importantly, Alexander II suspected that the British and Ottoman governments had instructed Circassians to seek return with the purpose of sparking a new war against their Russian overlords. As a consequence, he was known to personally decline such petitions.

== Consequences ==
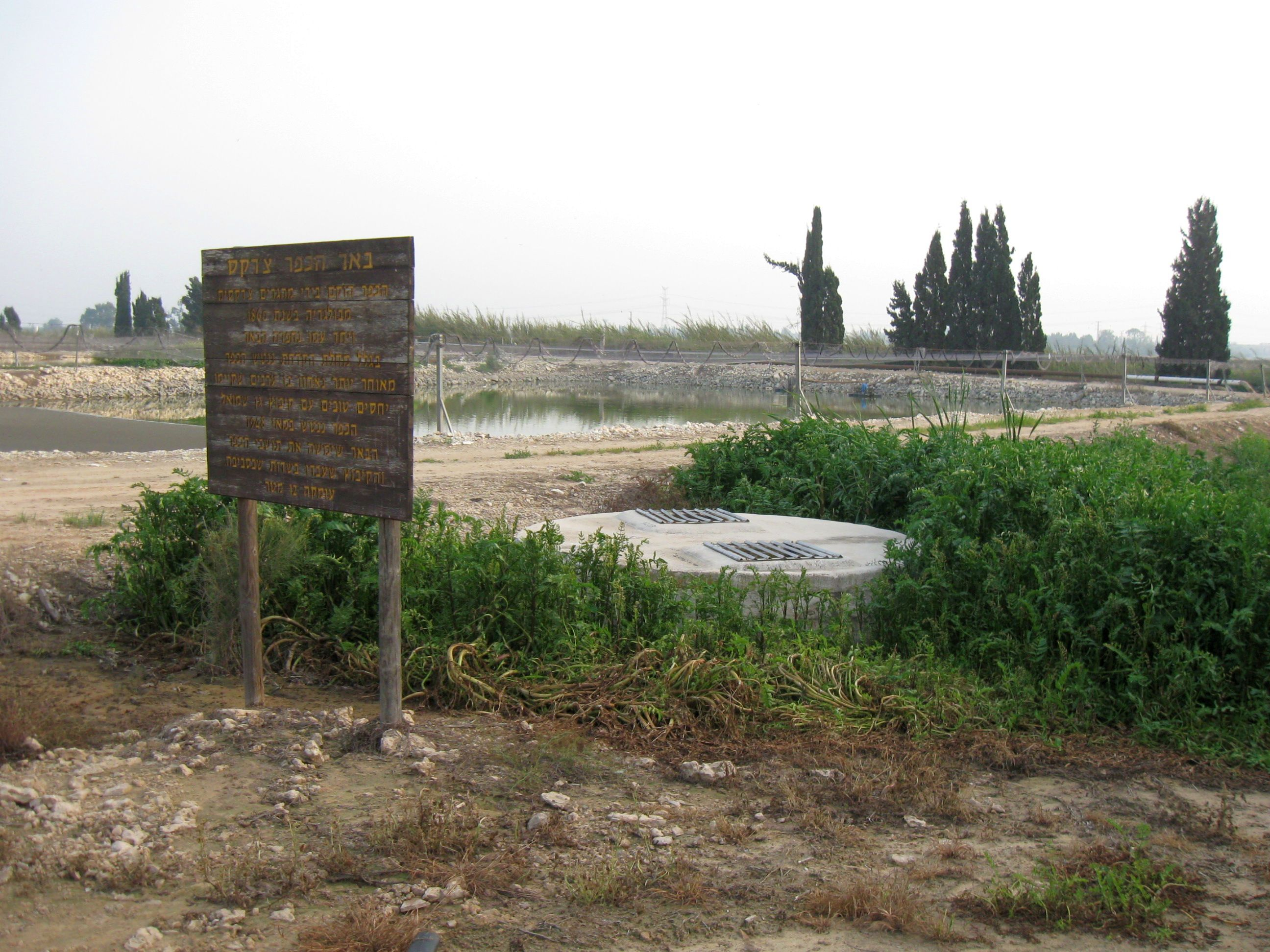
Site of Circassian village established in 1860 in the Ottoman Levant, abandoned soon after due to malaria

Ubykh prince and military commander Gerandiqo Berzeg, who was the chairman of the Circassian Majlis and the last leader of the Circassian Confederation

The overall resettlement was accompanied by hardships for the common people. A significant number died of starvation – many Turks of Adyghe descent still do not eat fish today, in memory of the tremendous number of their kinfolk that they lost during the passage across the Black Sea.

Some of the deportees and their descendants did well and they would eventually earn high positions within the Ottoman Empire. A significant number of Young Turks had Caucasian origins.

All nationals of Turkey are considered Turkish for official purposes. However, there are several hundred villages which are considered purely "Circassian", whose total "Circassian" population is estimated to be 1,000,000, although there is no official data in this respect, and the estimates are based on informal surveys. The "Circassians" in question may not always speak the languages of their ancestors, and Turkey's center-right parties, often with varying tones of Turkish nationalism, generally do well in localities where they are known to constitute sizable parts of the population (such as in Akyazı).

In Middle Eastern countries, which were created from the dismembered Ottoman Empire (and were initially under an Allied protectorate), the fate of the ethnos was better. The Al Jeish al Arabi (Arab Legion), created in Trans-Jordan under the influence of Lawrence of Arabia, in significant part consisted of Chechens – arguably because the Bedouin were reluctant to serve under the centralized command. In addition, the modern city of Amman was born after Circassians settled there in 1887.

Apart from substantial numbers of Kabardian Circassians consisting of qalang tribes, small communities of mountainous Circassians (nang tribes) remained in their original homeland under Russian rule that were separated from among one another within an area heavily resettled by Russian Cossacks, Slavs and other settlers. For example, the capital of the Shapsugh tribe was renamed after the Russian general that committed atrocities in the region along with the erection of a victory statue to him. In the Caucasus, some 217,000 Circassians remained in 1897.

=== Ethnic tensions in the Ottoman Empire ===
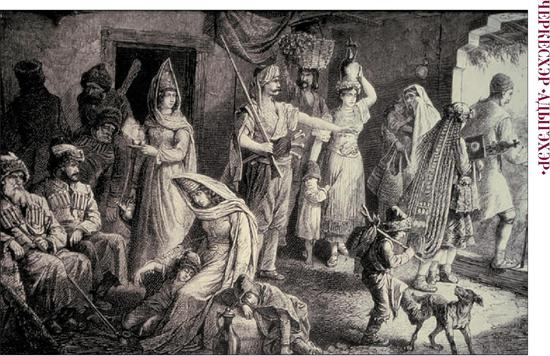
Circassians are settled in the house of an evicted Bulgarian family, painting in the 1870s

Misha Glenny notes that the settlement of the Circassian deportees played a major role in destabilizing the Ottoman Balkans, especially Bulgaria. Their arrival helped spread starvation and epidemics (including smallpox) in the Balkan territories, and worse, the Porte ordered that Christians be evicted en masse from their homes in certain areas in order to accommodate the need to house the deportees. This, and the outbreak of armed conflict between the Circassians and the Christian and Muslim natives, accelerated the growth of nationalist sentiments in the Balkans. Kadir Natho argues that the Ottomans coopted the Circassians into a "police force" in the Balkans as well as for settling them to increase the local Muslim population, with Circassians being made to take arms against rebellions, even those Circassians that had not settled in affected regions. The local Balkan peoples, having just taken on large numbers of Crimean Tatar refugees, an operation which had caused the deaths of thousands of refugees and natives alike due to disease and starvation, were sometimes loath to take in more Muslim refugees expelled by the Russians, and some Bulgarians, in particular, were convinced that Circassians had been placed into scattered Bulgarian villages "in order to paralyze any kind of liberation and independence Slavic movement". While, in many areas, Bulgarian Christians had initially been very hospitable to the Circassian refugees, including by producing extra resources to support them, the collapsing humanitarian situation combined with the political instability caused relations between the two groups to spiral downward.

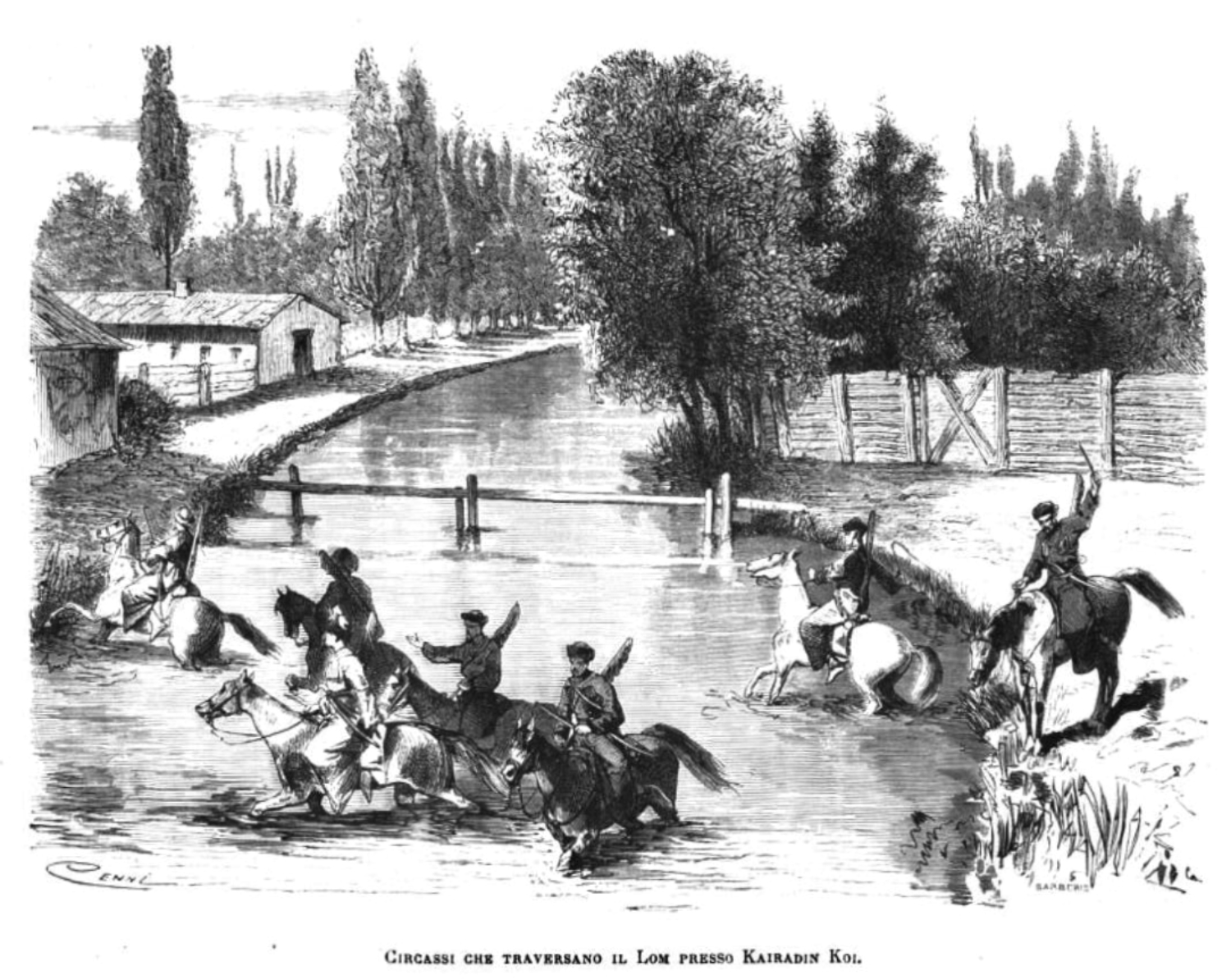
Circassians crossing the Lom.

In many cases, lands were assigned to North Caucasian refugees by the Ottoman government, but the locals refused to give up their homes, causing outbreaks of fighting between Circassians and Chechens on one side, and the Bulgarian, Serbian, Arab, Bedouin, Druze, Armenian, Turkish and Kurdish natives on the other, leading to armed conflict. In Uzun Aile, between Kayseri and Sivas, Circassians ultimately pushed the local Kurdish population out, and to this day the Kurds with roots in that region recall in a folk song how a "cruel fair-haired and blue-eyed people with sheep-skin hats" drove them from their homes. Traumatized, desperate, and having lived for many decades previously in a situation where Circassians and Russians would regularly raid each other, Circassians sometimes resorted to raiding the native populations, ultimately causing a reputation for the Circassians as being particularly barbaric to spread throughout the Empire.

Eventually, fear of the Circassians, due to the diseases they spread and the stereotype of them as either beggars or bandits, became so great that Christian and Muslim communities alike would protest upon hearing that Circassians were to be settled near them.

Later, in the 1870s, war again struck in the Balkans where most Circassians had made their homes, and they were deported by Russian and Russian-allied forces a second time.

== Numbers of refugees ==
Alan Fisher notes that accurate counts of the refugees were difficult to impossible to obtain because "Most of those leaving the Caucasus did it in a hurry, in a disorganised fashion, without passing any official border point where they might have been counted or officially noted", however estimates have been made primarily based on the available documents including Russian archival documents as well as Ottoman documents.

- 1858–1860: Over 30,000 Nogais left
- 1860–1861: 10,000 Kabardians left
- 1861–1863: 4,300 Abaza, 4,000 Natukhais, 2,000 Temirgoi, 600 Beslenei, and 300 Bzhedugs families were exiled
- by 1864: 600,000 Circassians have left for the Ottoman Empire, with more leaving afterwards
- 1865: 5,000 Chechen families were sent to Turkey
- 1863–1864: 470,703 people left the West Caucasus (according to G. A. Dzidzariia)
- 1863–1864: 312,000 people left the West Caucasus (according to N. G. Volkova)
- Between November 1863 and August 1864: over 300,000 Circassians seek refuge in the Ottoman Empire; over two thirds die.
- 1858–1864: 398,000 people left the Kuban oblast (according to N. G. Volkova)
- 1858–1864: 493,194 people left (according to Adol'f Berzhe)
- 1863–1864: 400,000 people left (according to N. I. Voronov)
- 1861–1864: 418,000 people left (according to the Main Staff of the Caucasus Army)

German historian Karl Friedrich Neumann estimated that out of the 1.5 million Circassian exiles who tried to flee to Anatolia from the extermination campaigns of the Russian imperial army, more than 500,000 people died during death marches. Another half a million deaths occurred due to severe diseases that broke out in Circassian refugee camps along the Anatolian coasts.

== Genocide classification ==
In recent times, scholars and Circassian activists have proposed that the deportations and mass killings can certainly be considered as a manifestation of the modern-day concept of genocide, though the term had not been in use in the 19th century. Noting the systematic massacre of villages by Russian soldiers that was accompanied by the Russian colonization of these lands, Circassian activists claim it is "certainly and undeniably" a genocide. Scholars estimate that some 90 percent of Circassians (estimated at more than one million) had vanished from the territories occupied by Russia. During these events, at least hundreds of thousands of people were "killed or starved to death".

Anssi Kulberg has asserted that the Russian Empire played a central role in formulating "the strategy of modern ethnic cleansing and genocide" during its systematic extermination campaigns against Crimean Tatars and Circassians, which were referred to as muhajirism by the Russian imperial government.

The parliament of Kabardino-Balkaria recognized the Circassian genocide in 1992, which was followed by the recognition by the parliament of Adygea in 1994. As of 2025, the events have been also recognized as genocide by Ukraine and Georgia. No other country classifies the so-called muhajirism as genocide.

=== Political positions ===
Recognition of the Circassian Genocide: States that recognize the Circassian genocide States that explicitly deny the Circassian genocide States with internal divisions that recognize the Circassian genocide

==== Russia ====
On 1 June 2005, the Circassian Congress, an organization that unites representatives of the various Circassian peoples in the Russian Federation, submitted a petition to the Russian Duma first to acknowledge and then to apologize for tsarist policies that Circassians say constituted a genocide. Their appeal pointed out that "according to the official tsarist documents more than 400,000 Circassians were killed, 497,000 were forced to flee abroad to Turkey, and only 80,000 were left alive in their native area." On 27 June 2006, the Russian parliament (Duma) rejected the petition, stating that "current realities demand new forms of work in accordance with the collective rights of the peoples, and it seems that today we all must search for something common that unites the peoples of the Russian Federation". Thus, the Duma refused to address Circassian grievances related to previous Russian governments, leaving the Circassians without compensation, unlike the Karachays, Balkars, and Cossacks, who received such measures for Soviet-era repression, a decision that was expected to create further tensions within the region.

In Russia, a presidential commission had been set up in 2009 to try to deny the Circassian genocide, with respect to the events of the 1860s. There is concern by the Russian government that acknowledging the events as genocide would entail possible claims of financial compensation and efforts toward repatriating diaspora Circassians back to Circassia.

In 2026 a number of Circassian diaspora organisations outside Russia published an open letter protesting against "conscious and systematic distortion of historic facts" in a TV report published by Russian state media which described the Circassian genocide as "geopolitical misfortune" and forced exile as "voluntary migrations", while transferring the responsibility for the actual military violence against civilians from Russian army to the external powers and/or the foresight of local actors.

===== Boris Yeltsin =====
Former Russian president Boris Yeltsin's May 1994 statement stated that Circassian resistance to the Tsarist forces was legitimate, and that there were sad casualties, but he did not recognize "the guilt of the tsarist government for the genocide".

===== Kabardino-Balkaria and Adygea =====
On February 7, 1992, the Kabardino-Balkarian Autonomous Soviet Socialist Republic condemned the Circassian Genocide. On May 12, 1994, the Republic of Kabardino-Balkaria and on April 29, 1996, the Republic of Adygea submitted applications to the State Duma of the Russian Federation for the recognition of the Circassian Genocide. In 1997 and 1998, the leaders of Kabardino-Balkaria and Adygea sent appeals to the Duma to issue an apology; to date, there has been no response from Moscow.

==== Circassian Organizations ====
In October 2006, the Adygeyan public organizations of Russia, Turkey, Israel, Jordan, Syria, the United States, Belgium, Canada, and Germany have sent the president of the European Parliament a letter with the request to recognize the genocide against Adygean (Circassian) people.

==== Georgia ====
On 20 May 2011, the Parliament of Georgia passed a resolution stating that pre-planned mass killings of Circassians by Imperial Russia, accompanied by "deliberate famine and epidemics", should be recognized as "genocide", and that those deported during those events from their homeland should be recognized as "refugees". The parliament declared in its resolution that the mass annihilation of the Cherkess (Adyghe) people during the Russian-Circassian war and thereafter constituted genocide as defined in the Hague Convention of 1907 and the UN Convention of 1948. Georgia has made outreach efforts to North Caucasian ethnic groups since the 2008 Russo-Georgian War. Following a consultation with academics, human rights activists and Circassian diaspora groups and parliamentary discussions in Tbilisi in 2010 and 2011, Georgia became the first country to use the word "genocide" to refer to the events. The next year, on 21 May, a monument was erected in Anaklia, Georgia, to commemorate the suffering of the Circassians. On 16 February 2012, the Georgian government opened a Circassian Cultural Centre in Tbilisi to study and promote the history and culture of the Circassians and other Caucasian peoples. The opening was attended by members of the Circassian diaspora from the United States and Europe and was welcomed by Iyad Yogar, president of the US Circassian Cultural Institute.

==== Ukraine ====
On 9 January 2025 the Verkhovna Rada of Ukraine voted in favor of a resolution that recognizes "mass extermination of the Circassians and their forced expulsion from their historical homeland" as a genocide, expresses solidarity with Circassians, honor the memory of the victims and condemns the actions of Russia.

==== Turkey ====
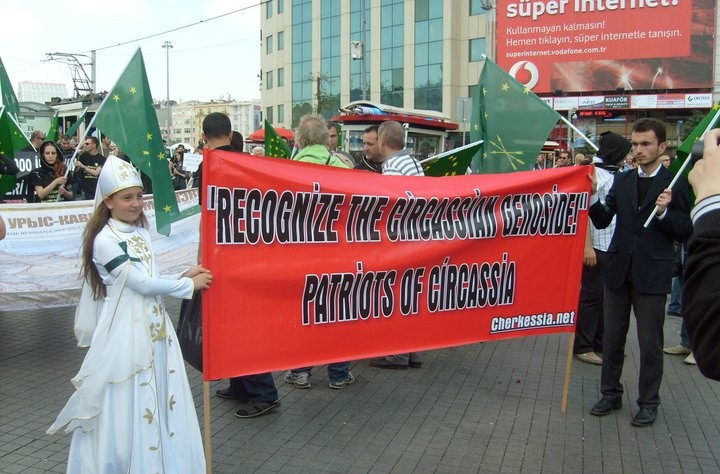
Circassian march calling for the recognition of the Circassian genocide, Turkey

Circassians in Turkey have made multiple attempts to get Turkey to recognize the genocide. There are multiple monuments in Turkey erected to commemorate the Circassian genocide. Turkish politicians have referenced the events multiple times. Every year on 21 May, Turkish politicians and major political parties post Tweets commemorating the events, while referring to it as an "exile", including Recep Tayyip Erdoğan. Some political parties such as the Pluralist Democracy Party (ÇDP), Labour Party (EMEP) and Peoples' Democratic Party (HDP) have called on Turkey to recognize the genocide.

==== Appeals to world governments by Circassians ====
On 1 December 2015, in the Great Union Day (the national day of Romania), a large number of Circassian representatives sent a request to the Romanian government asking it to recognize the Circassian genocide. The letter was specifically sent to the president (Klaus Iohannis), the prime minister (Dacian Cioloș), the president of the Senate (Călin Popescu-Tăriceanu) and the president of the Chamber of Deputies (Valeriu Zgonea). The document included 239 signatures and was written in Arabic, English, Romanian and Turkish. Similar requests had already been sent earlier by Circassian representatives to Estonia, Lithuania, Moldova, Poland and Ukraine. In the case of Moldova, the request was sent on 27 August of the same year (2015), on the Moldovan Independence Day, to the president (Nicolae Timofti), the prime minister (Valeriu Streleț) and the president of the Parliament (Andrian Candu). The request was also redacted in Arabic, English, Romanian and Turkish languages and included 192 signatures.

=== Scholarly viewpoints ===
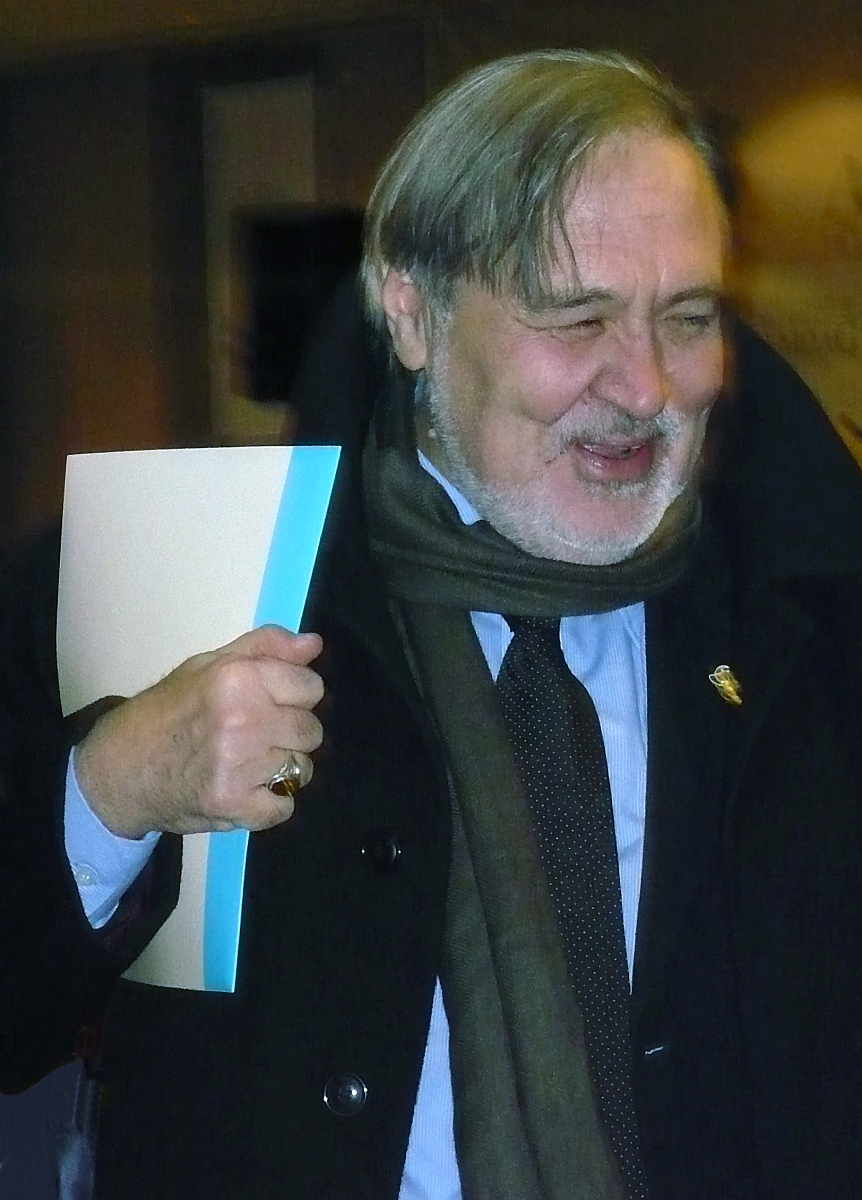
Professor Doctor İlber Ortaylı

Most scholars today agree that the term "genocide" is justified to define the events, except some Russian scholars in the minority. Some scholarly views include:

- Alexander Ohtov says the term genocide is justified in his Kommersant interview:
  Yes, I believe that the word "genocide" is justified. To understand why we are talking about the genocide, you have to look at history. During the Russian–Caucasian war, Russian generals not only expelled the Circassians, but also destroyed them physically. Not only killed them in combat but burned hundreds of villages with civilians. Spared neither children nor women nor the elderly. They killed and tortured them with no separation. The entire fields of ripe crops were burned, the orchards cut down, people burnt alive, so that the Circassians could not return to their habitations. A destruction of civilian population on a massive scale ... is it not a genocide?
- Scholar Anssi Kullberg states that the "Russian suppression of the Caucasus" directed at the Crimean Tatars and Circassians, resulted in the Russian state "inventing the strategy of modern ethnic cleansing and genocide".
- Paul Henze credits the events of the 1860s in Circassia with inspiring the Armenian genocide at the hands of the Ottoman Empire.
- Walter Richmond also argues the term "genocide" is appropriate, considering the events of 1864 to have been "one of the first examples of modern social engineering". Citing international law which holds that "genocidal intent applies to acts of destruction that are not the specific goal but are predictable outcomes or by-products of a policy, which could have been avoided by a change in that policy", he considers the events to have been genocide on the grounds that the ensuing demographic transformation of Circassia to a predominantly ethnically Russian region was viewed as desirable by the Russian authorities, and that the Russian commanders were fully aware of the huge number of deaths by starvation that their methods in the war and the expulsion would bring, as they viewed them as necessary for their supreme goal that Circassia be firmly and permanently Russian territory, all the while viewing Circassia's native inhabitants as "little more than a pestilence to be removed".
- Michael Ellman, in a book review of Richmond's Circassian Genocide, agrees that the term's use is justified under the UN definition as referring to actions intending to destroy "in whole or in part an ethnic group", with the part referring to those Circassians whom St. Petersberg thought could not accept its rule.
- According to the Italian historian Fabio Grassi, the word "exile" would unquestionably underestimate the scale of the events, and the word "massacre" can be used to describe it.
- French historian Robert Mantran used the term "Circassian Exile and Genocide" to describe the events in volume 3 of his book Ottoman History.
- Turkish historian Server Tanilli used the term "Great Circassian Exile, Genocide, and Massacre" for the events in his work The Reality and Heritage of Centuries.
- The events were described as "an exile to certain death" by the Turkish historian İlber Ortaylı. In May 2021, Ortaylı attended a KAFFED conference dedicated to the Circassian genocide, where he advised the Circassians to "keep their heads up and make their voice heard".

== Modern movement for the rights and freedoms of Circassians ==
In 2014, the Circassian movement culminated in the Circassian protests against the Sochi Olympics. In response to the actualization of the "Circassian issue" Russia attempted to combat them by suppressing Circassian protests and discrediting the Circassian movement by linking it to external factors – the interests of countries such as Georgia, the United States and Israel.

In 2017, the Circassian national movement experienced a national upsurge, leading to an increased readiness of Circassians to defend their own identity. Large-scale events took place on May 21, 2017, simultaneously in several regions of Russia, in which tens of thousands of Circassians in Adygea, Kabardino-Balkaria and Karachay-Cherkessia took part in mourning events dedicated to the anniversary of the end of the Russian-Caucasian War. The multi-million diaspora of Circassians abroad was not left aside, for example, there was a mass procession with national banners of Circassia through the central streets of Turkish cities. For the first time in the history of post-war Circassia, which today exists only in the historical memory of Circassians, commemorative events dedicated to the victims of the Russian-Caucasian war were held in schools, higher educational institutions, and in cities with a compact population of Circassians.

As a result of the Tsarist exile (1864), 90% of the Circassian people are diaspora (about 6 million people, including 1.5 million citizens of Turkey). However, this does not prevent Circassian activists from advocating for the revival and development of their native language and the creation of a separate Circassian national republic in the North Caucasus. Russian officials have already expressed concern that the influx of Circassians from abroad would change the ethnic balance in the republic, strengthen the common Circassian identity, and encourage calls to restore statehood and independence.

In March 2019, Circassian activists formed the Coordinating Council of the Circassian Community. The activists seek international recognition of the 1860s genocide and a defense of their right to learn and speak their historic languages. In 2021, Circassian demonstrations were held in several Russian cities despite government repression. The largest rally was held in Nalchik, attended by about 2,000 people. In September 2021, two new independent Circassian organizations were established – the Circassian (Adygean) Historical and Geographical Society and the United Circassian Media Space. Their plans include the study and defense of Circassian history, the return of Circassian topographic names, and the preservation and multiplication of the Circassian language and identity. Circassian activists are focusing on the 2021 census by launching a petition calling on large communities to declare themselves Circassians (indigenous Adygs). Such an initiative encourages rediscovery of Circassian history and the revitalization of Circassian identity, which was divided and distorted by the Tsarist, Soviet, and Russian regimes. On October 3, 2021, leaders of eight Circassian organizations appealed to their brethren across the North Caucasus to use their own self-designation in the census, rather than the alien one imposed on them by Moscow.

=== Contemporary Struggle for Circassian Language and Culture ===
In June 2018, a law promoting Russification was passed: the study of all non-Russian languages in schools became voluntary, while the study of Russian remained compulsory. Circassians (Adygs) consider the de facto abolition of indigenous languages as a continuation of the Russian extermination and expulsion of the Circassian population from the North Caucasus, which began in 1864 with deportation and genocide.

Aslan Beshto, chairman of the Kabarda Congress, believes that the main task for Circassians today is to preserve their native language, which he sees as the key to their ethnic identity.

Circassian activists say that Circassian culture is still practically not presented to the public, in particular, there are very few books in the Circassian language.

Asker Sokht, chairman of the public organization Adyge Khase in Krasnodar Krai, also believes that "the main tasks facing Circassians as an ethnic group are the preservation of their language and culture". In 2014, he was detained and sentenced to eight days of arrest. Soht's detention was related to his criticism of the Sochi Olympics, as well as his active public activities.

Since the beginning of 2022, the Russian authorities have been working systematically to cancel Circassian (Adyghe) commemorative and festive events. Under far-fetched pretexts, they banned the celebration of the Circassian flag day, and later banned the procession that had become traditional in honor of the mourning day of May 21. The procession still took place in Nalchik in 2026, despite warnings from the authorities.

=== Persecution of Circassian activists ===
In May 2014, on the eve of May 21, Beslan Teuvazhev, one of the organizers of a campaign to make commemorative ribbons for the 150th anniversary of the Russian-Caucasian War, was detained by Moscow police officers. More than 70 thousand ribbons were seized from him. Later Teuvazhev was released, but the ribbons were not returned, having found "signs of extremism in the inscriptions" printed on them. Circassian activists call such an act "a continuation of the policy of oppression of national minorities" of the times of the empire.

In November 2014, the representative of the movement "Patriots of Circassia" Adnan Huade and the coordinator of the public movement "Circassian Union" Ruslan Kesh were among the signatories of the appeal of activists of Circassian public organizations to the leadership of Poland with a request to recognize the genocide of Circassians in the 19th century. In 2015, the activists were subjected to searches and detentions by law enforcement officials.

In spring 2017, a court in the Lazarevsky district of Krasnodar Krai sentenced seventy-year-old Circassian activist Ruslan Gvashev for his participation in the May 21, 2017 mourning events dedicated to the memory of the victims of the Russian-Caucasian War. Ruslan Gvashev is a well-known Circassian activist in the region, head of the Shapsug Khase, chairman of the Congress of Adyg-Shapsugs of the Black Sea region, vice-president of the Confederation of Peoples of the Caucasus and the International Circassian Association. The court found the defendant guilty of organizing an unauthorized rally and imposed a fine of 10,000 rubles on him. Due to the disability of the accused (Gvashev has one leg amputated), the court released him directly from the courtroom. Gvashev sought help from the Kabardino-Balkarian Human Rights Center in order to obtain a review of his case and recognition of the Circassians' right to hold memorial events.

Numerous facts of harassment of activists, such as commissioned trials against the most prominent figures of the Circassian national movement, made activists feel it necessary to seek a fair solution in international courts. Eventually, the European Court of Human Rights accepted the complaints of Circassian activists accused of extremism by the Russian Themis. The year-long attempt of civil activists from the organization "Circassian Congress" to shed the label of "extremism" ended with an appeal to the European Court. Before seeking justice outside Russia, the activists spent 4 years trying to get justice in Russian courts. All this time, as the activists themselves say, they and their families were under pressure – they received threats from FSB and Interior Ministry officers. The case of civil activists from the Circassian Congress is far from being an isolated one.

The reprisals by the Russian authorities against national minorities and activists of Circassian public organizations defending the rights of these minorities in the North Caucasus have taken on an unprecedented scale.

The danger of the Circassian national movement for Russia lies in its great potential: Circassians are the titular (and largest) ethnic group in three regions of the North Caucasus – Kabardino-Balkaria, Karachay-Cherkessia and Adygea. Also worrying to Russia is the presence of a multi-million diaspora in the Middle East, some of which returned to the North Caucasus due to the horrific Syrian civil war. According to human rights activists, the increasing cases of persecution of Circassian activists are directly related to the growth of the Circassian movement in virtually all republics of the Russian North Caucasus.

== Commemoration ==
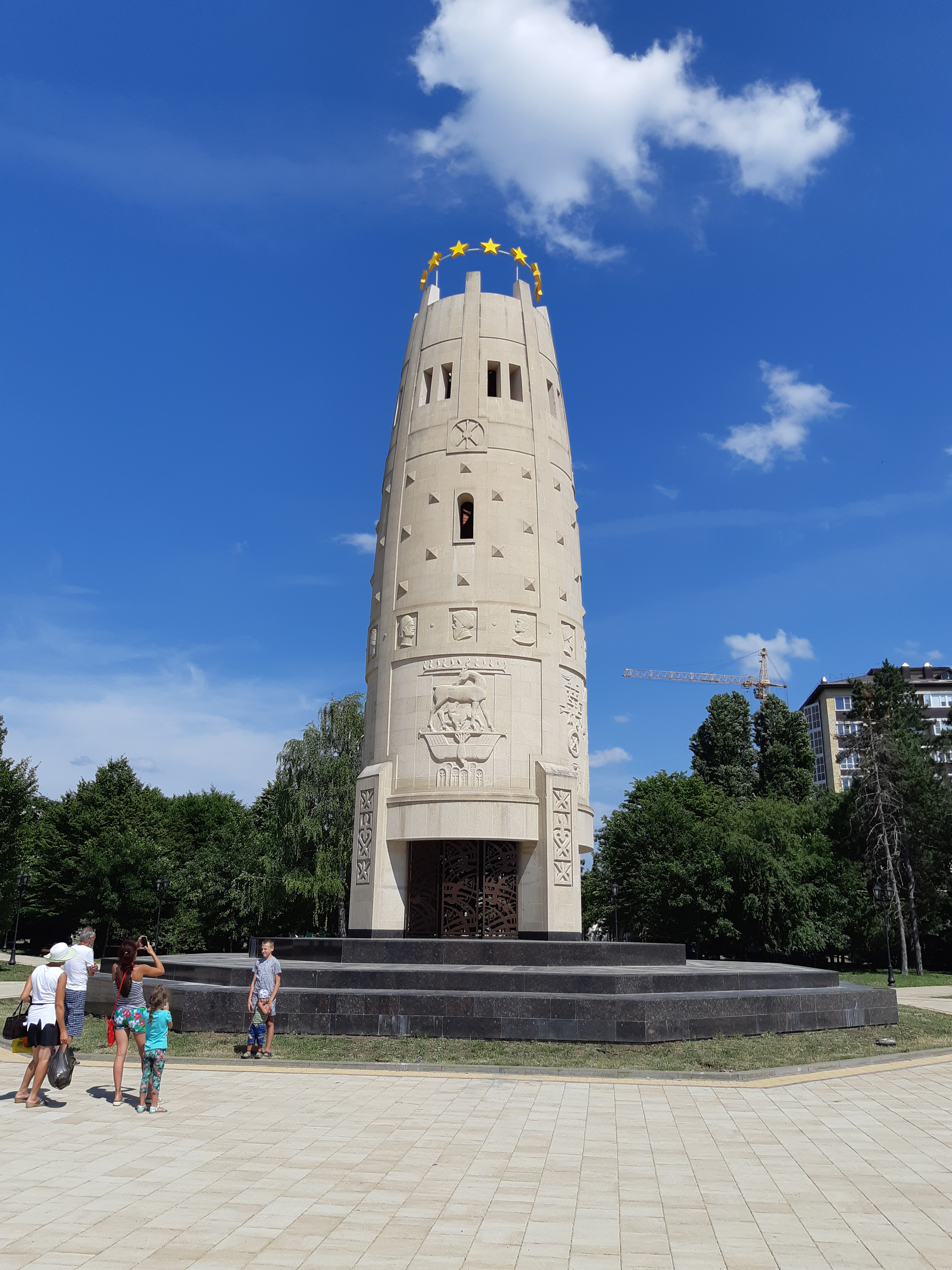
Monument in Maykop, Adygea mourning the Circassian genocide

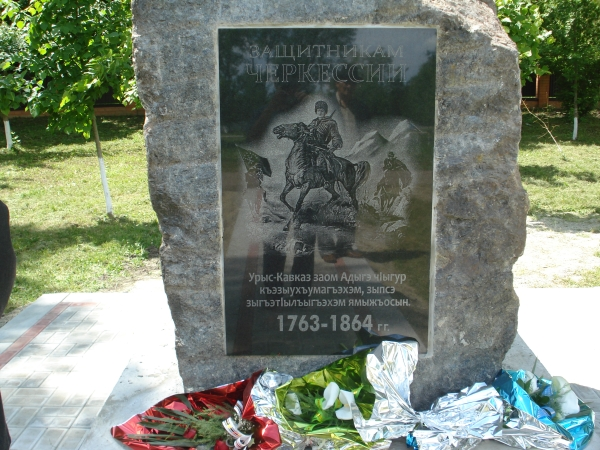
A monument dedicated to the Circassian genocide, Republic of Adygea

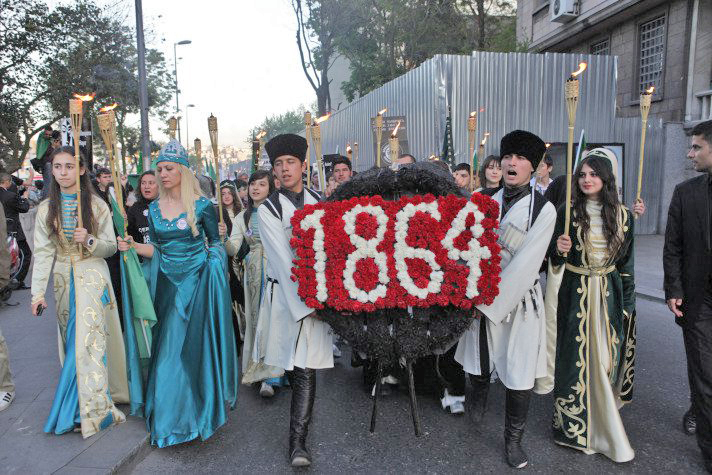
Circassian Day of Mourning. Annual remembrance marches of the Circassian genocide by Circassian diaspora, Turkey

== See also ==
- Circassians
- Circassian Slave Trade
- Persecution of Muslims
- Circassian diaspora
- Circassian nationalism
- Circassian Day of Mourning
- Chechen genocide
- List of genocides by death toll
