= Hidden Nations, Enduring Crimes =

Circassian Conference in Tbilisi in March 2010

Hidden Nations, Enduring Crimes was a Circassian congress or conference held March 20, 2010, in the Georgian capital of Tbilisi, funded in part by the Circassian members of the Western political analysis center, the Jamestown Foundation and the Ilia State University's International School for Caucasus Studies in Georgia.

== Resolution ==
The congress passed a resolution, urging Georgia to become the first UN-recognized state to recognize the Circassian genocide.

- 20 March 2010
- Circassians from the Diaspora and the homeland participating in the conference entitled "Hidden Nations, Enduring Crimes: The Circassians and the People of the North Caucasus Between Past and Future" (Tbilisi, March 19–21, 2010), present the following request for a resolution by the Parliament of Georgia:
- The Circassian nation is one of the indigenous nations of the Caucasus. Due to the Russian Empire's policy of expansion in the Caucasus during the 18th and 19th centuries, Circassians lost more than 1.5 million lives. The Circassian nation continues to suffer till today as a consequence of these crimes and policies.
- Circassia is a nation denied by genocide, having been deprived of its independence as a result of colonization, mass crimes, mass deportation and ethnic cleansing. Today, Circassia remains a victim of continuous genocide and a nation in exile.
- Circassians, whose unity and indigenous status in historical Circassia is denied by the Russian Federation, have never received international acknowledgment of their tragedy.
- Circassians strive to restore historical justice and condemn the Russian Empire's historical colonialism as well as current Russian Federation policies against the interests of the Circassian people in their motherland and in the Diaspora.
- Based on undeniable documented historical facts corroborating the genocide of the Circassian nation in the 19th and the beginning of the 20th centuries, and based on the following conventions adopted by the United Nations:
- Convention on the Prevention and Punishment of the Crime of Genocide, adopted on December 9, 1948;
- Convention on the Non-Applicability of Statutory Limitations to War Crimes and Crimes against Humanity, adopted on November 26, 1968;
- The above mentioned participants call upon the Parliament of Georgia as well as the Governments of All Nations, to pass a resolution to:
- Condemn acts by the Russian Empire in the 19th and the beginning of the 20th centuries, resulting in the loss of independence of Circassia, and to recognize these acts as a genocide of the Circassian nation and its people;
- Declare May 21st, which marks the Russian celebration of the conquering of the North West Caucasus in 1864, as a memorial day of the victims of the Circassian genocide, and to recognize Sochi as the location and symbol of Circassian genocide and ethnic cleansing.

== Reactions ==
=== Among Circassians ===
Circassian nationalist organizations hailed the event of the conference having occurred at all as a victory. One youth Circassian organization stated that "The Circassian youth of the republic of Adygea received the news about the call by participants in the Tbilisi conference to recognize the genocide of Circassians by Russia with great hope for a positive decision on the part of Georgian lawmakers... The possible recognition of the genocide of our people will become an important step in the process of settling the Circassian question. Today, the problem of the Circassians is making it to the international level and the Russian government authorities will not be able to disregard this issue anymore."

However, some less youthful Circassian organizations were less positively disposed to Georgia, because of its conflict with Abkhazia, which has close ethnic ties to Circassia.

The response of Abkhazia's government to the congress (which was to deny that the genocide occurred, alienating not only the Circassians but also the Abkhaz diaspora in Turkey; see respective sections) and of pro-Abkhaz Circassians has caused an increasing rejection of Abkhazia as an ally by some Circassians, and that continuing to view its government as such would be "stupid".

=== In Georgia ===
Since the 2008 South Ossetia war Georgia has notably moved to a sympathetic position towards the peoples of the North Caucasus, including the Circassians.

Many commentators have noted that, since Russian recognition of South Ossetia and Abkhazia, Georgia has moved to an increasingly sympathetic stance towards not only the Circassians, but other independence-minded groups in the North Caucasus, such as the Chechens and Ingush, having Alla Dudayeva (wife of the deceased first independent Chechen president) as an announcer in its new Russian-language news station- Georgian public broadcasting's "First Caucasus TV" (available at https://web.archive.org/web/20101018211102/http://1k-tv.com/), for example.

Three days after the congress, Georgian intellectual Giorgi Kvelashvilli submitted an opinion piece urging Georgians to support recognition of the Circassian genocide and for the government in Tbilisi to pass the bill. In his last paragraph, he states that

A possible recognition of the Circassian genocide might be logically put in the aforementioned Georgian activities, which could strengthen the image of Georgia as a defender of "the Caucasus cause" in the eyes of not only Circassians but other ethnic minorities in the North Caucasus too. But if Georgia wants to achieve more than a PR success, it might be prudent to consider other additional measures as well: Georgia should act in concert with other nations, most importantly those where Circassian diasporas reside; mass deportations of Chechens and Ingush as well as other ethnicities by Soviet dictator Stalin in the 1940s and ethnic cleansings of Georgians from Abkhazia and Tskhinvali must be closely linked to the Tsarist atrocities in the 19th century since they constitute virtually the same imperialist policy; and lastly, the scheduled Sochi Olympics must be closely tied to the Circassian and environmental issues as well as to the illegal Russian occupation of Georgian lands.

This editorial piece is, in fact, part of a larger pattern over 2008-2010 towards an explicitly not only anti-Russian, but also pro-Circassian and pro-Chechen stances among Georgian intellectuals.

In 2010, Georgia established a visa-free regime for residents of the North Caucasus living within its borders, much to the gratitude of the Chechen diaspora in Georgia.

=== Among Chechens and Ingush ===
Chechen and Ingush nationalists and activists, upon hearing of the Congress, congratulated Georgia, and furthermore moved to try to persuade Georgia to recognize genocides against them as well. Khizir Aldamov, the "head of the Chechen diaspora" and representative to the Georgian government urged Georgia to recognize the "Chechen genocides" (i.e. probably referring to Operation Lentil, called Aardax by the Chechens and Ingush; though it could be Tsarist tactics during the wars of the 1800s or the current wars). He also stated that Georgia should make the Chechen position more understood to the West and counter Russian manipulation of information on the Chechens around the world, and that Georgia and Chechnya held a common foe, so they are natural allies. To quote,

Moscow claims that the situation in North Caucasus is stable. In contrast to these claims, the West must be objectively informed. The official representatives of Tbilisi in all democratic states should express real information about the events in Chechnya. Today, Georgia is a country whose words are given adequate attention by the West. However, like Chechnya, a part of Georgia is occupied by Russia and the resistance must be unified against the common enemy.

Among other things, Aldamov referred to South Ossetia as "a part of Georgia... occupied by Russia" and condemned Kadyrov's accusations against Georgia.

Chechen activists have now taken to making steps to publicizing what they view as genocide to the west. In October 2010, Anzor Maskhadov (son of the former president of Ichkeria) issued an appeal to gather materials on what he called "the genocides against Chechens in the 20th and 21st centuries" A website (currently only in Russian) on the genocides was also put up, available at http://www.chechentragedy.com. Other websites, such as World Chechnya Day.org were also set up to try to win the sympathy of the West for both historical and modern occurrences.

== Sequel conference ==
A sequel to the conference, this time titled "Hidden Nations, Enduring Crimes: The North Caucasus Between Past and Future", was held at the same location in Tbilisi, on November 19–21, 2010.
