= Pluralist Democracy Party (Turkey) =

Pluralist Democracy Party Çoğulcu Demokrasi Partisi
- Abbreviation: ÇDP
- Leader: Faruk Arslandok
- Founded: August 15, 2014
- Membership: 236
- Ideology: Circassian nationalism Conservatism; Pluralist democracy Multiculturalism; Anti-zionism
- Slogan: Çoğunlukçu değil, çoğulcu demokrasi (Not majoritarian, but pluralist democracy)

Pluralist Democracy Party (Turkish: Çoğulcu Demokrasi Partisi; ÇDP for short) is a political party of Turkey founded on 15 August 2014. Faruk Arslandok is the general chairman. It is a party founded by Circassians in Turkey, and is also known as the "Circassian Solidarity Party" in unofficial media, and defends the "brotherhood and freedom of people". ÇDP entered the June 2015 general elections in Turkey with independent candidates.
