= X-linked recessive hypoparathyroidism =

- X-linked recessive manner of inheritance
- Specialty: Endocrinology

X-linked recessive hypoparathyroidism is a rare, congenital form of hypoparathyroidism.

== Signs and symptoms ==
The signs and symptoms of X-linked recessive hypoparathyroidism are characteristic of hypoparathyroidism and its consequent hypocalcemia. They include acute symptoms, like paresthesia, twitching of the hands and feet, unconsciousness, and trouble breathing; and chronic symptoms, including seizures, tiredness, irritability, cardiac insufficiency, abnormal heart rhythms, papilledema, cataracts, calcium deposits in the brain, and loss or brittleness of hair, skin, and nails.

== Genetics ==
This disease is named for its inheritance, which occurs in an x-linked recessive pattern.

== Pathophysiology ==
In this particular form of hypoparathyroidism, the parathyroid glands are underdeveloped and therefore do not produce enough parathyroid hormone. This is caused by a mutation on the x chromosome in the region of Xq26-27.

== Diagnosis ==
Hypoparathyroidism can be diagnosed using blood tests, the Chvostek sign, and the Trousseau sign. If comorbid conditions like congenital malformations, impaired growth, and intellectual disability are present, it may be a genetic form of hypoparathyroidism; the affected gene can be determined using a DNA test.

== Treatment ==
X-linked recessive hypoparathyroidism is treated like other forms of the disease, using calcium and vitamin D supplementation. Supplementation with parathyroid hormone is another treatment option.
