= Moreau de Tours =

Moreau de Tours is a name that can refer to:

- Jacques-Joseph Moreau, psychiatrist known for his works on haschish (cannabis resin)
- Georges Moreau de Tours, painter
- Paul Moreau de Tours, psychiatrist known for his works on suicide
