= Trousseau sign =

Trousseau sign is the name of two distinct phenomena observed in clinical medicine. Both are attributed to Armand Trousseau:

- Trousseau sign of latent tetany
- Trousseau sign of malignancy (a.k.a. migratory thrombophlebitis)
