= Bretonneau Hospital (Tours) =

Hospital in France

- Location within France

Geography
- Location: Tours, France
- Coordinates: 47°23′13″N 0°40′04″E

Services
- Beds: 812

Bretonneau Hospital is a public healthcare facility in the department of Indre-et-Loire, France. It is the oldest component of the Tours University Hospital Center (CHRU). Two of its buildings were designated as Monuments historiques on October 21, 1992.

== Location ==
The hospital is situated in the western sector of Tours, within a quadrilateral area bounded by Boulevard Tonnellé and Rue Walwein (north–south), and Rue de l’Hospitalité and Rue Victor-Hugo (west–east), encompassing approximately 15 hectares.

== From the Hospice of Charity to the General Hospital of Charity ==
=== Dual role of hospice and confinement facility ===
Around 1530, in response to recurring epidemics such as plague and cholera, a temporary health shelter, or sanitas (Latin for "health"), was established in Tours. It consisted of a wooden structure built near the Sainte-Anne stream, west of the city, in a marshy area. By the following century, poverty and vagrancy had become more pressing issues than disease, as the city's economy declined. In 1641, Louis XIII granted an annual subsidy of 4,000 livres to the city to establish and operate an almshouse. The institution was formally established in 1656, during the reign of Louis XIV, as the General Hospital of Charity, serving both to assist the poor and to confine them to maintain public order.

Three 80-meter-long buildings were constructed on the site of the current hospital, designated respectively for men, women, and administrative services. Over time, the institution gradually reverted to its original function as an asylum. In 1766, a Royal College of Surgery was established on the premises, with authorization to conduct practical dissection courses on cadavers. The hospital continued to operate in this manner until the French Revolution, although hygiene conditions were often inadequate, with the Sainte-Anne stream serving as a channel for hospital wastewater.

=== Limited impact during the Revolution ===
During the War in the Vendée, the Charity Hospital was converted into a military hospital. In 1793, it was subject to laws governing nationalized property. By 1796, it was reinstated in its original buildings, which had not been sold, and received additional property from assets confiscated from émigrés and the Church.

=== Consolidation of Tours' hospital institutions ===
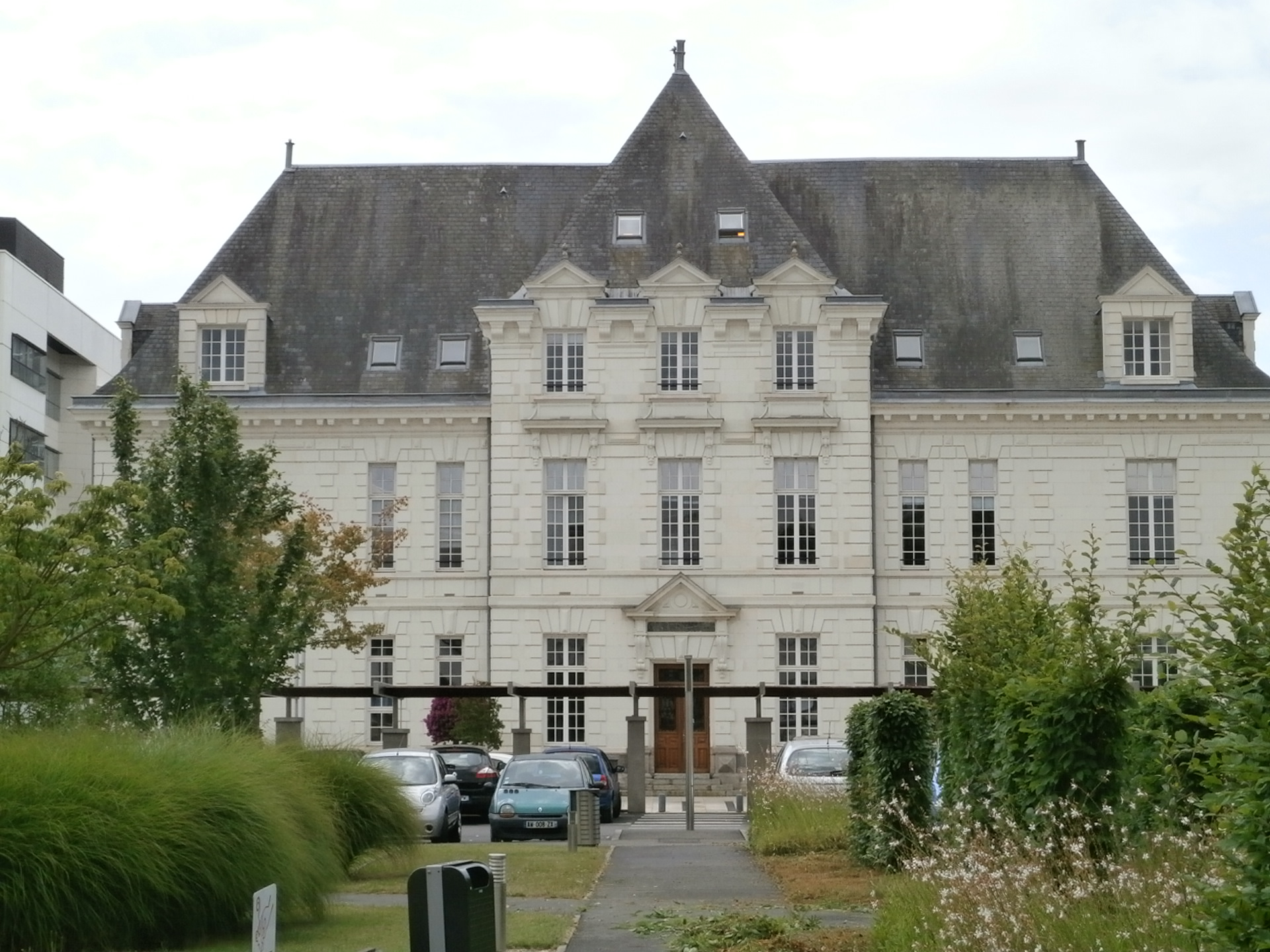
Administrative building.

A significant development in the hospital's history occurred in 1803 when the Charity Hospital merged with two other medical institutions in Tours: the Hôtel-Dieu, located near the cathedral, and the Madeleine Hospital in Saint-Pierre-des-Corps. This consolidation led to overcrowding, to the extent that the hospital chapel was temporarily used to accommodate patients. Sanitary conditions outside the facility improved over time; the Sainte-Anne stream began to be filled in from 1774, and its former course became the site of the Tours Botanical Garden in 1831. (Note: The communication route between the Cher and the Loire, originally served by the Sainte-Anne brook until 1774, was replaced in 1828 by the Duke of Berry Canal, located at the eastern end of Tours.) The unification of the city's hospices initiated a period of administrative and structural reorganization that extended through the first half of the 19th century.

In 1809, a new administrative structure was implemented with the appointment of a management committee, which included, for a time, the father of Honoré de Balzac. In 1814, the hospital briefly resumed a military role by admitting wounded soldiers from the Grande Armée. The current Human Resources Department is located in the Cour des Militaires (Military Courtyard), named in reference to this historical use.

=== "Great physicians" ===
During the 19th century, the General Hospital of Tours became a prominent medical center, associated with several notable physicians. Pierre-Fidèle Bretonneau and Louis Tonnellé practiced at the hospital, while Armand Trousseau and Alfred Velpeau completed part of their medical training under Bretonneau before continuing their careers in Paris. Other significant medical figures associated with the hospital included Louis Henry Jérôme Tonnellé (known as Tonnellé senior), Nicolas Heurteloup, and members of the Moreau family, particularly Jacques-Joseph Moreau and his son Paul Moreau de Tours, who contributed to the development of the city's medical reputation.

Several physicians contributed significantly to the development of the hospital and the well-being of the local population. The Herpin family produced three notable figures—Félix Herpin (1772–1852), Félix Charles Herpin (1812–1894), and Octave Herpin—each of whom served as chief surgeon and actively participated in hospital affairs. They promoted surgical education, advanced medical research, and contributed to public health. Louis Tonnellé (referred to as Tonnellé junior) shared the role of chief surgeon with Félix Herpin until 1841, and subsequently with Félix Charles Herpin.

These medical professionals advocated for reforms in public health services. Pierre Bretonneau established and managed a vaccine depot, Louis Tonnellé worked to introduce free consultations, and Thomas Moreau highlighted difficulties in hospital access, noting in an 1844 report the disadvantages caused by the hospital’s isolation. Located on the outskirts of the city during the 19th century due to concerns about contagion, the hospital both attracted and deterred patients. Nonetheless, the efforts of these physicians helped transform the hospital into a center of advanced medical knowledge shaped by a dedicated medical staff.

=== Organization of the modern hospital ===
Following the 1803 merger of Tours' hospices, the general hospital underwent a gradual process of adaptation. The relocation of services from the Hôtel-Dieu and the Madeleine Hospital took several years, with the complete transfer of surgical wards beginning in 1816. At that time, the surgery department included multiple wards organized by ailment, as well as a maternity ward. The hospital also expanded its services, establishing a pavilion for patients with venereal diseases in 1826, an orphanage in 1840, and an asylum for the mentally ill. Between 1815 and 1848, the hospital was supplied with water from an artesian well.

The 19th century saw significant organizational developments. In March 1804, the hospital formally distinguished the roles of physician, surgeon, and pharmacist, clarifying the separation between medicine and surgery. By the late 1820s, civilian and military hospital functions were separated, each maintaining independent surgery and medicine departments while remaining connected.

During the first half of the century, hospital organization remained provisional. Space was utilized to its maximum capacity while construction proceeded incrementally. Between 1815 and 1817, an anatomy amphitheater was built for medical and surgical students. Overcrowding and poor sanitary conditions later prompted the administration to adopt a more systematic construction policy.

In 1827, the men’s surgery wards were relocated to a new building, followed in 1873 by the transfer of the women’s surgery wards to the former medicine building. This move brought the women’s surgery wards closer to the maternity ward, both of which were overseen by surgeons, with the maternity ward also staffed by student midwives. In 1875, the construction of a new pavilion called the "Women’s Hospital (Surgery Department)" was initiated and inaugurated in 1879, reflecting a reorganization policy that had begun in the 1830s.

This reorganization was part of a broader trend seen in other cities such as Angers, Lyon, and Paris, where 19th-century hospital structures shifted focus from hospitality toward an increasingly medical role. Beginning in 1860, (Note: A. D. Indre-et-Loire, H Dépôt 4 L 77, several letters from Chief Surgeon Herpin, dated January 17, 1860, May 18, 1862, October 8, 1862, and September 11, 1876) chief surgeon Félix Charles Herpin advocated for limiting the presence of chronic and incurable patients at the General Hospital of Tours, reforming admission procedures to prioritize patients of scientific interest. This change had a significant impact on medical practice at the hospital.

=== General hospital: a place of teaching and observation ===
In the 19th century, hospital practitioners in Tours developed methods to study the populations visiting the hospital, anticipating increases in patient numbers, particularly during the construction of the Tours courthouse in the early 1840s. Physicians and surgeons utilized the growing patient attendance to conduct medical research. Many were members of the Medical Society of Indre-et-Loire, an important forum for the exchange of medical knowledge in Touraine. Through this society, practitioners stayed informed about contemporary advances in France and published their own findings. Their observations and reports, covering topics such as the operation of a strangulated hernia in 1838 and the presentation of a congenital nasal cleft in 1873, appeared in the Collected Works of the Medical Society of Indre-et-Loire from as early as 1833. (Note: A. D. Indre-et-Loire, 360 PERU 1 and 360 PERU 2, concerning the Recueils de travaux de la société médicale d'Indre-et-Loire (Proceedings of the Indre-et-Loire Medical Society) from 1833 to the 20th century.)

Hospital physicians encountered a wide variety of patients and injuries, prompting them to reorganize departments and classify patients by gender, age, injuries, and ailments. Unlike city doctors who served a stable clientele, hospital staff managed a constantly changing population, with some patients returning for follow-up and others visiting only once. (Note: A.D. Indre-et-Loire, 1 X 541, 1 X 542, 1 X 543, Nominal registers from 1851, 1855, and 1865.) This diversity allowed practitioners to study numerous diseases, observe symptoms, and develop or modify treatments. Autopsies were routinely performed when patients died, making hospital departments important centers for advancing medical and surgical knowledge. (Note: A.D. Indre-et-Loire, H Dépôt 4 L 77, Fourth half-yearly journal of Dr. LECLERC, January 4, 1829.) This environment encouraged students to train in hospitals before attending medical faculties. In the 19th century, the Tours hospital trained several students who later became notable medical professionals, including Alfred Velpeau.

The general hospital served as a training center for students in medicine, surgery, pharmacy, and midwifery. Admission was annual, and studies were divided into externship and internship phases, each with distinct roles. Initially, medical and surgical students were limited to observation and identified by brown aprons. Over time, students took on greater responsibilities, becoming the primary workforce within departments. Their duties included monitoring and distributing meals, changing dressings, and performing night shifts. Students worked across multiple departments, both in the civilian and military sections, utilizing the hospital’s full range of resources for medical education.

Until 1841, medical education at the hospital was informal. Early in the 19th century, chief surgeon Gouraud introduced a system allowing students to assist with daily tasks. In 1816, the hospital administration expanded this instruction by implementing a curriculum that included courses in materia medica, botany, medical chemistry, practical pharmacy, pathology, osteology, operative medicine, and forensic medicine. In 1825, the hospital and the Municipal Council of Tours proposed establishing around twenty Secondary Schools of Medicine, but Tours was not selected by the Ministry of the Interior. (Note: A.D. Indre-et-Loire, 5 M 26, Letters dated April 14, 1825, April 20, 1825, and May 10, 1825.) Despite this, the hospital continued to develop its medical education program, revising the curriculum multiple times until 1841. Following the ordinance of 13 October 1841, Pierre-Fidèle Bretonneau initiated the creation of a Preparatory School of Medicine and Pharmacy in Tours. The city received royal authorization from King Louis-Philippe, (Note: A.D. Indre-et-Loire, 5 M 31, Order of the King of June 22, 1841.) and the school opened in January 1842. (Note: A.D. Indre-et-Loire, 5 M 31, Inspection report dated April 6, 1842.) Courses were initially held in a temporary location while a new building was constructed. The medical school was situated on the grounds of the general hospital but operated under its own administration. The first directors were chief surgeons of the hospital: Louis Tonnellé (1841–1853), Félix Charles Herpin (1853–1880), and Octave Herpin. (Note: A.D. Indre-et-Loire, IN/16/1/3 to IN/16/1/77, Directories of the department of Indre-et-Loire, from 1803 to 1880.)

== From the 20th-century hospital to the University Hospital Center of Tours ==
=== New services funded by donations ===
Between the early 20th century and the Second World War, the hospital expanded through private donations, enabling the construction of a new maternity ward, a nursery, a sanatorium, and the acquisition of additional facilities. In 1937, it was renamed the Bretonneau General Hospice in honor of the physician Pierre-Fidèle Bretonneau.

During the Second World War, several hospital buildings were requisitioned by the German army, leading to the relocation of patients to private clinics in Tours. In 1943, the hospital was also used to house juvenile delinquents.

=== Modern hospital ===
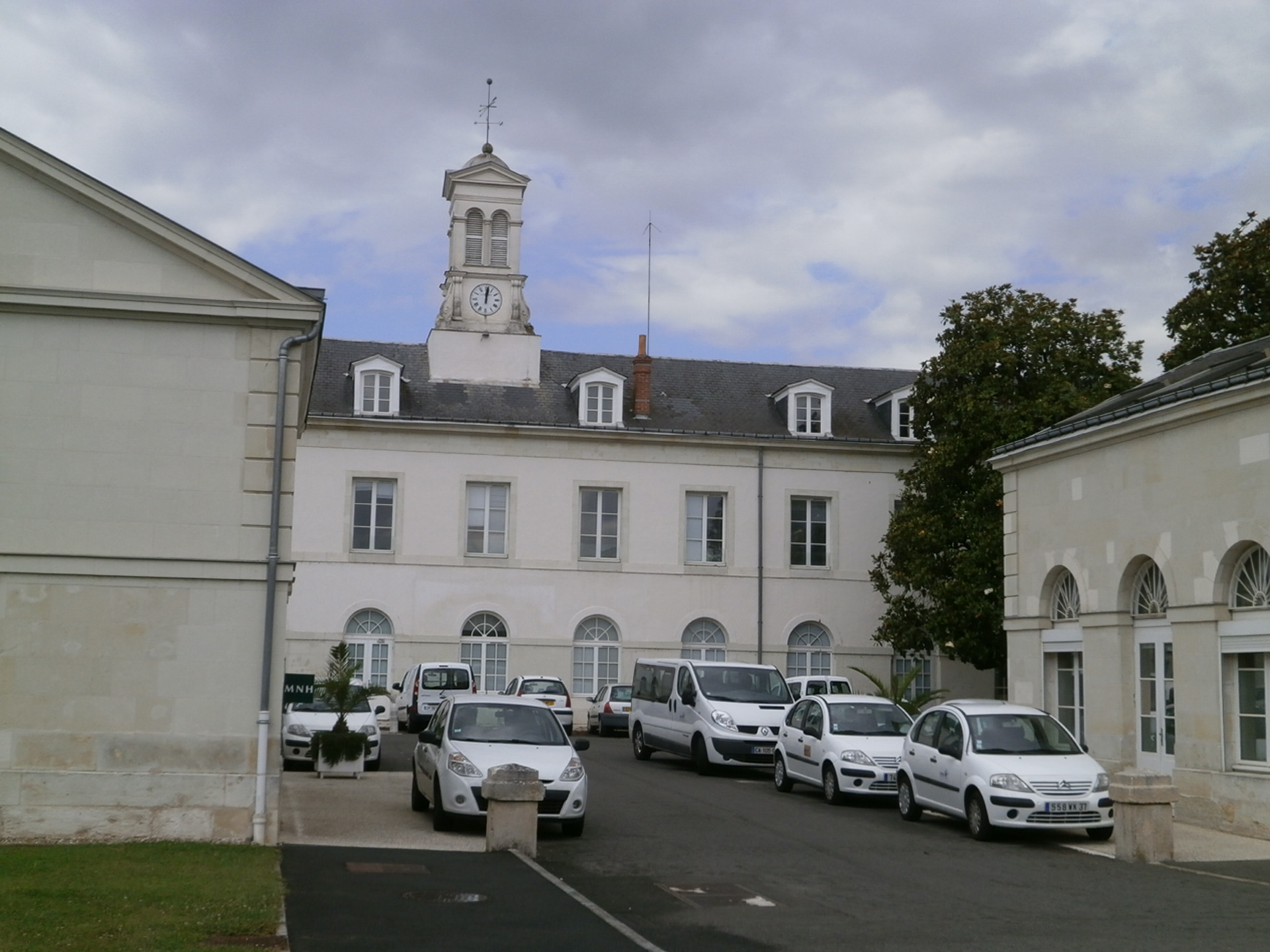
Military Court.

In 1952, the Clocheville Hospice, established in 1881 with private funds to care for poor and sick children, was placed under the management of the Bretonneau General Hospice, becoming its pediatric unit.

Hospital reforms led by Robert Debré and Guy Mollet transformed the Bretonneau Hospice into a University Hospital Center (CHU) in 1958.

In 1968, 35 hectares south of Tours were acquired to construct the modern Trousseau Hospital, which opened in 1980. Along with Bretonneau, Clocheville, and other public hospital facilities in the area, it became part of the Tours Regional University Hospital Center (CHRU Tours). The site also includes the maternity ward of Tours within the Olympe de Gouges Center.

== Protected buildings ==
Two buildings on the Bretonneau Hospital site are officially protected as historical monuments. The chapel and the facades and roofs of the former military hospital were designated as such by order on 21 October 1992.

=== Chapel ===
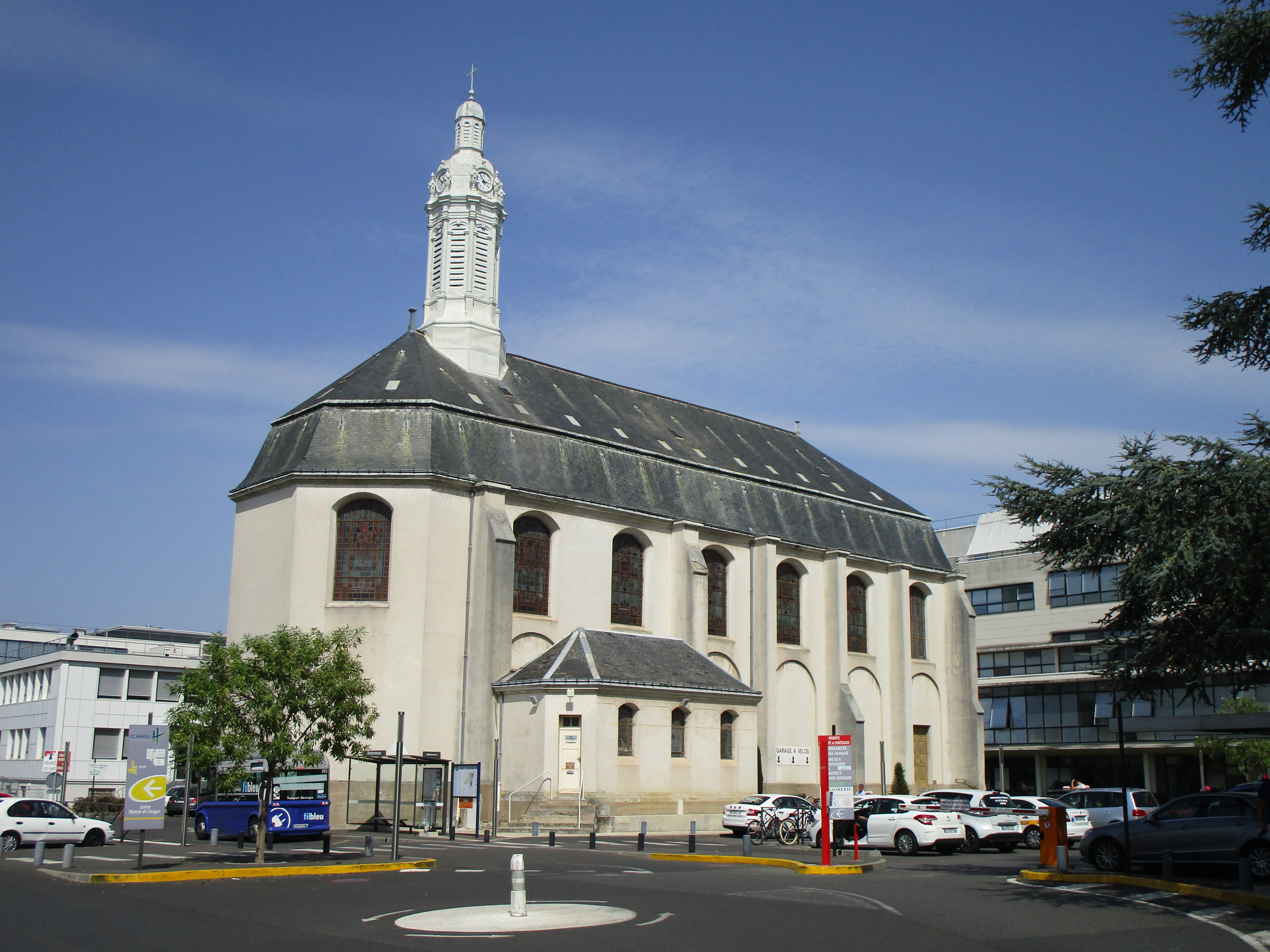
Saint Roch Chapel at the hospital.

The chapel, dedicated to Saint Roch, was constructed in Jesuit style beginning in 1661, based on plans by architect Daniel Massé. Its bell tower was removed in 1794. Due to hospital overcrowding, the chapel was repurposed to accommodate wounded soldiers during the War in the Vendée and again during the Franco-Prussian War of 1870, which likely contributed to its preservation. It was restored in 1879 by Léon Rohard at the request of the Dominican sisters, with the installation of a flat wooden ceiling featuring painted coffers and updated interior decoration. The stained glass windows, created by the Lobin workshop, date from 1878. An organ was installed in 1867 to provide music instruction for blind youth.

The chapel is regularly included in guided tours, especially during European Heritage Days, and hosts classical music concerts.

=== Former military hospital ===
The former military hospital consists of a series of buildings arranged around a square courtyard, situated to the left of the entrance to the Bretonneau CHRU on Boulevard Tonnellé. Constructed in neoclassical style, the buildings were likely designed by architect Gustave Guérin around 1830. The complex underwent restructuring in the mid-2000s.

== See also ==
- Tours
- Monument historique

== Bibliography ==
=== Books ===
- Académie des sciences, arts et belles-lettres de Touraine (2017). Dictionnaire des scientifiques de Touraine [Dictionary of Scientists from Touraine] (in French). Tours: Presses Universitaires François-Rabelais.
- Le Breton, David (2008). La chair à vif, De la leçon d'anatomie aux greffes d'organes [Raw flesh, from anatomy lessons to organ transplants] (in French). Paris: Editions Métailié.
- Carol, Anne (2014). Les médecins et la mort, XIXe – XXe siècle [Doctors and death, 19th–20th centuries] (in French). Paris: Flammarion.
- Carol, Anne (2015). L'embaumement, une passion romantique, France XIXe siècle [Embalming, a romantic passion, France in the 19th century] (in French). Ceyzeriére: Champ Vallon.
- Chevalier, Bernard (1985). Histoire de Tours [History of Tours] (in French). Toulouse: Privat. ISBN 2-7089-8224-9.
- Donzé, Pierre-Yves (2000). L'ombre de César, les chirurgiens et la construction du système hospitalier vaudois (1840-1960) [The shadow of Caesar, surgeons, and the construction of the Vaud hospital system (1840–1960)] (in French). Geneva: Georg.
- Foucault, Michel (1978). Naissance de la clinique [Birth of the clinic] (in French). Paris: PUF.
- Faure, Olivier (1993). Les Français et leur médecine au XIXe siècle [The French and their medicine in the 19th century] (in French). Paris: Belin.
- Goubert, Jean-Pierre (1982). La médicalisation de la société française, 1770-1830 [The medicalization of French society, 1770–1830] (in French). Waterloo: Historical Reflections Press.
- Luauté, Jean-Pierre (2018). Les Moreau de Tours [The Moreau family of Tours] (in French). Paris: Editions Glyphe.
- Mandressi, Rafaël (2003). Le regard de l'anatomiste, Dissection et invention du corps en Occident [The anatomist's gaze, Dissection and invention of the body in the West] (in French). Paris: Seuil.
- Marec, Yannick (2007). Accueillir ou soigner ? L'hôpital et ses alternatives du Moyen Âge à nos jours [To welcome or to treat? Hospitals and their alternatives from the Middle Ages to the present day] (in French). Mont-Saint-Aignan: Publication des Universités de Rouen et du Havre.
- Petit, Jacques-Guy; Saint-André, Jean-Paul (2009). Médecine et hôpitaux en Anjou, du Moyen-Âge à nos jours [Medicine and hospitals in Anjou, from the Middle Ages to the present day] (in French). Rennes: Presses Universitaires de Rennes.

=== Articles ===
- Olivier, Faure (1984). "La médecine gratuite au XIXe siècle : de la charité à l'assistance" [Free medicine in the 19th century: from charity to assistance]. Histoire, économie et société (in French) (4): 593–608.
- Olivier, Faure (1979). "L'hôpital et la médicalisation au début du XIXe siècle : l'exemple lyonnais (1800-1830)" [Hospitals and medicalization in the early 19th century: the example of Lyon (1800-1830)]. Annales de Bretagne et des pays de l'Ouest (in French) (2): 277–290.
- Christelle, Rabier (2011). "« Le service public » de la chirurgie : administration des premiers secours et pratiques professionnelles à Paris au XVIIIe siècle" [“Public service” in surgery: first aid administration and professional practices in Paris in the 18th century]. Revue d'histoire moderne et contemporaine (in French) (58–1): 101–127.
- Garnot, Nicolas (1984). "L'Hôpital Général de Paris. Institution d'assistance, de police, ou de soins ?" [The General Hospital of Paris. An institution for assistance, policing, or healthcare?]. Histoire, économie et société (in French). 3 (4): 535–542. doi:10.3406/hes.1984.1373. PMID 11635042.
- Thouvenot, Joseph (1992). "La chapelle Saint-Roch de l'hôpital Bretonneau ; son passé, son histoire" [The Saint-Roch Chapel at Bretonneau Hospital: its past and its history]. Bulletin de la Société archéologique de Touraine (in French). XLIII: 561–564.
