= Antidote =

Substance that can counteract a form of poisoning

An antidote is a substance that can counteract a form of poisoning. The term ultimately derives from the Greek term φάρμακον ἀντίδοτον (pharmakon antidoton), "(medicine) given as a remedy". An older term in English which is now rare is atterlothe, derived from "atter" ("poison, venom, morbid fluid"). Antidotes for anticoagulants are sometimes referred to as reversal agents.

The antidotes for some particular toxins are manufactured by injecting the toxin into an animal in small doses and extracting the resulting antibodies from the host animals' blood. This results in an antivenom that can be used to counteract venom produced by certain species of snakes, spiders, and other venomous animals. Some animal venoms, especially those produced by arthropods (such as certain spiders, scorpions, and bees) are only potentially lethal when they provoke allergic reactions and induce anaphylactic shock; as such, there is no "antidote" for these venoms; however anaphylactic shock can be treated (e.g. with epinephrine).

Some other toxins have no known antidote. For example, the poison batrachotoxin – a highly poisonous steroidal alkaloid derived from various poison dart frogs, certain beetles, and birds – has no antidote, and as a result, is often fatal if it enters the human body in sufficient quantities.

== Mechanical approaches ==
Ingested poisons are frequently treated by the oral administration of activated charcoal, which adsorbs the poison and flushes it from the digestive tract, thereby removing a large part of the toxin. Poisons which are injected into the body (such as those from bites or stings from venomous animals) are usually treated by the use of a constriction band which limits the flow of lymph and/or blood to the area, thus slowing the circulation of the poison around the body. This should not be confused with the use of a tourniquet which cuts off blood flow completely – often leading to the loss of the limb.

== Techniques to identify antidotes ==
In early 2019, a group of researchers in Australia published the finding of a new box jellyfish venom antidote using CRISPR. The technology had been used to functionally inactivate genes in human cell lines and identify the peripheral membrane protein ATP2B1, a calcium transporting ATPase, as one host factor required for box jellyfish venom cytotoxicity.

== List of antidotes ==
Agent	Indication
Activated charcoal with sorbitol	Used for many oral toxins
Theophylline or Caffeine	Adenosine receptor agonist poisoning
Antimuscarinic drugs (e.g. Atropine)	Organophosphate and carbamate insecticides, nerve agents, some poison mushrooms
Beta blocker	Theophylline
Calcium chloride	Calcium channel blocker toxicity, black widow spider bites
Calcium gluconate	Calcium channel blocker toxicity, hydrofluoric acid burns
Chelators such as EDTA, dimercaprol (BAL), penicillamine, and 2,3-dimercaptosuccinic acid (DMSA, succimer)	Heavy metal poisoning
Cyanide antidotes (hydroxocobalamin, amyl nitrite, sodium nitrite, or thiosulfate)	Cyanide poisoning
Cyproheptadine	Serotonin syndrome
Deferoxamine mesylate	Iron poisoning
Digoxin Immune Fab antibody (Digibind and Digifab)	Digoxin poisoning, Oleander ingestion
Diphenhydramine hydrochloride and benztropine mesylate	Extrapyramidal reactions associated with antipsychotics
100% Ethanol or fomepizole	Ethylene glycol poisoning and methanol poisoning
Flumazenil	Benzodiazepine overdose
100% oxygen or hyperbaric oxygen therapy (HBOT)	Carbon monoxide poisoning and cyanide poisoning
Idarucizumab	Reversal of dabigatran etexilate, an anticoagulant
Insulin + Glucagon	Beta blocker poisoning and calcium channel blocker poisoning
Leucovorin	Methotrexate, trimethoprim and pyrimethamine overdose
Intralipid	Local Anesthetic toxicity
Methylene blue	Treatment of conditions that cause methemoglobinemia
Naloxone hydrochloride	Opioid overdose
N-acetylcysteine	Paracetamol (acetaminophen) poisoning
Octreotide	Oral hypoglycemic agents
Pralidoxime chloride (2-PAM)	When given with Atropine: Organophosphate insecticides, nerve agents, some poison mushrooms
Protamine sulfate	Heparin poisoning
Prussian blue	Thallium poisoning
Physostigmine sulfate	Anticholinergic poisoning
Pyridoxine	Isoniazid poisoning, ethylene glycol, accidental hydrazine exposure (E.G from Gyromitra mushrooms)
Phytomenadione (vitamin K) and fresh frozen plasma	Warfarin overdose and some (but not all) rodenticides
Sodium bicarbonate	Aspirin, TCAs with a wide QRS
I.V Silibinin	Amatoxin ingestion
Succimer, chemical name Dimercaptosuccinic acid (DMSA)	Lead poisoning

== See also ==
- Antitoxin
- Antivenom
- Snakebite
- Universal antidote
- Shapur ibn Sahl
