= Nathan Weiss =

Austrian physician and neurologist

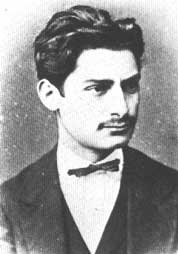
- Born: 8 May 1851; Velké Meziříčí, Moravia, Austrian Empire
- Died: 13 September 1883 (aged 32); Vienna, Austria-Hungary
- Education: Leipzig University; University of Göttingen
- Scientific career
- Workplaces: University of Halle; Leipzig University faculty

Nathan Weiss (8 May 1851 – 13 September 1883) was an Austrian medical doctor and neurologist born in Velké Meziříčí, Moravia, Austrian Empire (now Czech Republic). His father was the Talmudic scholar Isaac Hirsch Weiss.

He studied medicine in Vienna, earning his doctorate in 1874. He worked as secondary physician at the Allgemeines Krankenhaus in Vienna, and in 1879 became habilitated for internal medicine.

Weiss is remembered for pioneer systematic research of the spinal marrow, medulla oblongata and basal ganglia. The eponymous "Weiss's sign" is named after him, which today is usually referred to as "Chvostek's sign".

In 1881 he showed a causal relationship between tetany and the removal of goitre. Among his written works is a treatise on tetany (Über Tetanie) that is included in Richard von Volkmann's Sammlung klinischer Vorträge.

A friend of Sigmund Freud, Weiss committed suicide on 13 September 1883, at the age of 32, shortly after returning from his honeymoon. A few months prior to his death, he was appointed head of the outpatient clinic for nervous diseases at Vienna General Hospital.
