= Grass tetany =

- Other names: Hypomagnesemic tetany, grass staggers, winter tetany
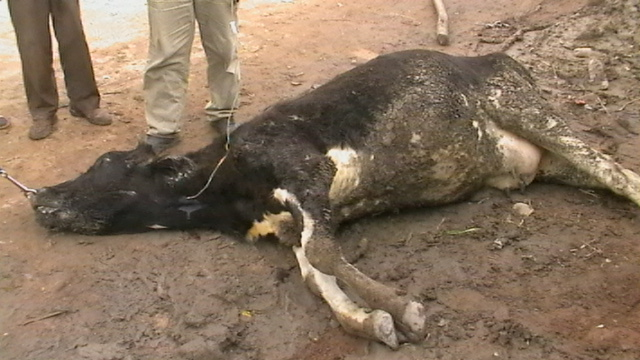
- Cow grazing on rapidly grown pasture with tetany of the neck suggesting grass tetany
- Specialty: Veterinary medicine

Grass tetany, also called the staggers, is a metabolic disease involving magnesium deficiency, which can occur in such ruminant livestock as beef cattle, dairy cattle and sheep, usually after grazing on pastures of rapidly growing grass, especially in early spring. Tetany refers to the symptom of muscle contractions and is unrelated to tetanus-causing bacteria.

== Symptoms and cause ==
Progressive symptoms may include grazing away from the herd, irritability, muscle twitching, staring, incoordination, staggering, collapse, thrashing, head thrown back, and coma, followed by death. However, clinical signs are not always evident before the animal is found dead.

The condition results from hypomagnesemia (low magnesium concentration in blood) which may reflect low magnesium intake, low magnesium absorption, unusually low retention of magnesium, or a combination of these. Commonly, apparent symptoms develop only when hypomagnesemia is accompanied by hypocalcemia (blood Ca below 8 mg/dL).

Low magnesium intake by grazing ruminants may occur especially with some grass species early in the growing season, due to seasonally low magnesium concentrations in forage dry matter. Some conserved forages are also low in magnesium and may be conducive to hypomagnesemia.

High potassium intake relative to calcium and magnesium intake may induce hypomagnesemia. A K/(Ca+Mg) charge ratio exceeding 2.2 in forages has been commonly considered a risk factor for grass tetany. Potassium fertilizer application to increase forage production may contribute to an increased K/(Ca+Mg) ratio in forage plants, not only by adding potassium to soil, but also by displacing soil-adsorbed calcium and magnesium by ion exchange, contributing to increased susceptibility of calcium and magnesium to leaching loss from the root zone during rainy seasons. In ruminants, high potassium intake results in decreased absorption of magnesium from the digestive tract.

Trans-aconitate, which accumulates in some grasses, can be a risk factor for hypomagnesemia in grazing ruminants. (Tetany has been induced in cattle by administration of trans-aconitate and KCl, where the amount of KCl used was, by itself, insufficient to induce tetany.) Relatively high levels of trans-aconitate have been found in several forage species on rangeland sites conducive to hypomagnesemia. Although at least one rumen organism converts trans-aconitate to acetate, other rumen organisms convert trans-aconitate to tricarballylate, which complexes with magnesium. Using rats as an animal model, oral administration of tricarballylate has been shown to reduce an animal's magnesium retention. Potassium fertilizer application results in increased concentration of aconitic acid in some grass species.

== Treatment ==
The affected animal is left in the pasture and treated with an intravenous solution of calcium and magnesium. A subcutaneous injection of an epsomite solution can also be used.

== Epidemiology ==
In Northern Europe, the disease occurs after winter housing. But in Australia and New Zealand, where the cows are not housed, the disease occurs in similar conditions, when the animal enters lush, grass-dominant pastures. In North America, grass tetany occurs most commonly when range stock are moved onto lush early pasture or when housed stock are turned out onto such pasture in the spring. A second high-risk period may occur in the fall. Although cereal grasses (e.g. winter wheat) and crested wheatgrass may be especially conducive to grass tetany, the problem can also occur with several other grass species. "Winter tetany" may occur with some silages, low-magnesium grass hays, or corn stover.
