= Pierre Bretonneau =

French physician (1778–1862)

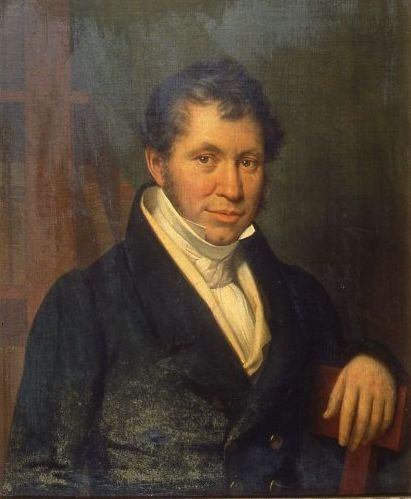
Portrait of Pierre Fidèle Bretonneau

Pierre-Fidèle Bretonneau (3 April 1778 – 18 February 1862) was a French medical doctor.

== Biography ==
Born in Saint-Georges-sur-Cher, in the Loir-et-Cher département. His father was a surgeon. He studied with his uncle, the vicar at Chenonceaux (Indre-et-Loire) department along with the children of the Chenonceau château. Madame Dupin, the grandmother of George Sand, financed his medical studies in Paris.

He married Marie-Thérèse Adam (1755, Paris - 1836, Chenonceaux), lecturer to Madame Dupin and illegitimate daughter of her son Jacques-Armand Dupin de Chenonceaux. The couple settled in Renaudière in Chenonceaux (the Renaudière is currently a restaurant and hotel). Very curious and clever, he had a laboratory at his disposal and occupied himself with gardening and other manual labours in his spare time.

He was the mayor of Chenonceaux from 1803 to 1807. He spent 15 years at Chenonceaux gaining experience, wrote his thesis in medicine in 1815 and then became medical director at the hospital in Tours; which currently bears his name. He continued his study of disease and founded the medical school at Tours.

Bretonneau died in 1862 in Paris. He is buried in Saint-Cyr-sur-Loire, near Tours.

== Significance to medicine ==
Bretonneau is one of the pioneers of modern medicine. He believed in "morbid seeds" that spread specific diseases from person to person. He identified typhoid fever and named diphtheria. His students included Alfred-Armand-Louis-Marie Velpeau, and Armand Trousseau.

He performed the first successful tracheotomy in 1825, distinguished between scarlet fever and diphtheria in 1826. He studied disease in detail and was the first to think that disease was caused by bacteria in 1855, however, a microscope was not available to him and he was unable to confirm his hypothesis. He also discovered that the same illness could manifest itself differently in different patients. It was the beginning of scientific medicine: where careful observation is used to find cures for sickness and solutions to problems.

== Other ==
- The faculty of medicine in Tours is decorated with three large bronze medallions representing Bretonneau, Velpeau and Trousseau.
- His bust is on display at the city hall in Saint-Georges-sur-Cher.
- The Grévin Museum in Tours has created a reenactment of an anatomy lesson given by Bretonneau, Velpeau and Trousseau.
