= Forme fruste =

In medicine, a forme fruste (French, "crude, or unfinished, form"; pl., formes frustes) is an atypical or attenuated manifestation of a disease or syndrome, with the implications of incompleteness, partial presence or aborted state. The context is usually one of a well defined clinical or pathological entity, which the case at hand almost — but not quite — fits.

An opposite term in medicine, forme pleine — seldom used by English-speaking physicians — means the complete, or full-blown, form of a disease.

== Use ==
According to gastroenterologist William Haubrich:

A patient may exhibit sudden, intense, epigastric pain and a rigid abdomen. He is thought to have a perforated peptic ulcer. But at operation, only a penetrating ulcer is found, sealed off by adhesion to the omentum or anterior abdominal wall. Such a patient is said to have a forme fruste of acute free perforation as a complication of his peptic ulcer disease.

== History ==
The Latin phrase frustra esse means "to be mistaken" or "to be confused". As a technical term in French, the cognate fruste has been used in two related ways. First, as an antiquarian’s term it refers to a coin, medal or ancient stone on which figures and characters can no longer be recognized due to wear. Secondly, it was employed in natural history to denote mollusk shells whose striations, grooves or tips were worn down. By extension, this sense could be applied to sculpture, pottery, or other objects of great antiquity.

It was in this sense of "indistinctness due to wear or through long use" that the French internist Armand Trousseau (1801–67) first employed the term in connection with an obscured form of Graves' disease, which he described as a "…maladie dite fruste par l’absence du goitre et de l’exophthalmie" ("…disease said to be crude [i.e., indistinct] for its absence of goiter and exophthalmia").

The term in medicine has evolved to mean a "not fully developed form of an illness", rather than simply an obscure form. Sigmund Freud (1856–1939) often used the term forme fruste in connection with incomplete or obscured cases of neuroses and psychoses and thus the literature of psychoanalysis is replete with it. (An equivalent term in German is minimalvariante, but Freud used the French version.)

== List of "forme fruste" medical syndromes ==
- "Forme fruste keratoconus", as opposed to "frank" keratoconus.
- "Zona fruste", early name for zoster sine herpete (shingles without the rash).
- "Forme fruste mitral regurgitation", mitral regurgitation due to fibroelastic deficiency with myxomatous changes (as opposed to fully formed degenerative changes seen in Barlow's disease).
- "Forme fruste cleft lip", also known as microform. This is the stated cause of the scar on actor Joaquin Phoenix's upper lip.
- "'Formes frustes of eosinophilic granulomatosis with polyangiitis" have also been described as eosinophilic vasculitis and/or eosinophilic granulomas in isolated organs without evidence of systemic disease.
- "'Forme fruste type of calcaneonavicular coalition", the mildest type of CN coalition before fibrous, cartilaginous, or osseous types.
- "Forme fruste choledochal cyst", a variant of choledochal cyst described in children in which there is an Anomalous Pancreaticobiliary Ductal Junction (APBDJ) with minimal dilatation of bile duct (6-10mm) in children and associated biliary and/ or pancreatic symptoms. The preferred treatment is bile duct excision. The reason for surgery is the significant risk of malignancy and for symptomatic relief.
- "Forme fruste Rett Syndrome", variant of Rett Syndrome which has a later age of onset compared with the classical form, with regression occurring between 1 and 3 years of age; hand use is sometimes preserved with minimal stereotypic movements.
- "Unilateral papillary cystadenoma" is suggested to be a forme fruste of Von Hippel-Lindau disease.
- "Forme fruste of an epileptiform discharge", an EEG abnormality which appears similar to an epileptiform discharge but with a poorly defined or nonstereotypic morphology, or with a more limited or fragmented cephalic distribution. This abnormality may represent a discharge that is less well-formed due to treatment with medications or may be seen as an age-limited epilepsy syndrome.
- "Forme fruste lupus", incipient, or hidden form, lupus. Seropositivity without clinical findings.
- "Forme fruste tuberous sclerosis", a reduced phenotypic expression of tuberous sclerosis.
- "Forme fruste Charcot-Marie-Tooth disease", manifests as pes cavus and absent ankle jerks only.
- "Forme fruste bipolar disorder" (cyclothymia), a variant of bipolar disorder characterised by regularly alternating periods of both heightened and depressed mood, neither of which meet the full criteria for mania, hypomania, or depression.
- "Forme fruste schizophrenia forms" (paranoid and schizotypal personality disorders) - Cluster A personality disorders which represent an accentuated variant of the whole schizophrenic process (schizotypal personality disorder) or the paranoid subtype specifically (paranoid personality disorder). Schizoid personality disorder, the third Cluster A personality disorder, is often also considered a "schizophrenia spectrum disorder."
- "Forme fruste McCune-Albright syndrome". McCune-Albright syndrome is typically a triad of precocious puberty, café au lait spots and fibrous dysplasia of bone. Some children present with a forme fruste variant with only one clinical feature.
- "Forme fruste long-QT syndrome", a congenital LQTS which only appears when an additional stress occurs.
- "Forme fruste pseudoxanthoma elasticum", a variant of pseudoxanthoma elasticum with limited symptoms.

== See also ==
- Cryptogenic
- Diagnosis of exclusion
