= Calcium channel blocker toxicity =

- Other names: Calcium channel blocker poisoning, calcium channel blocker overdose
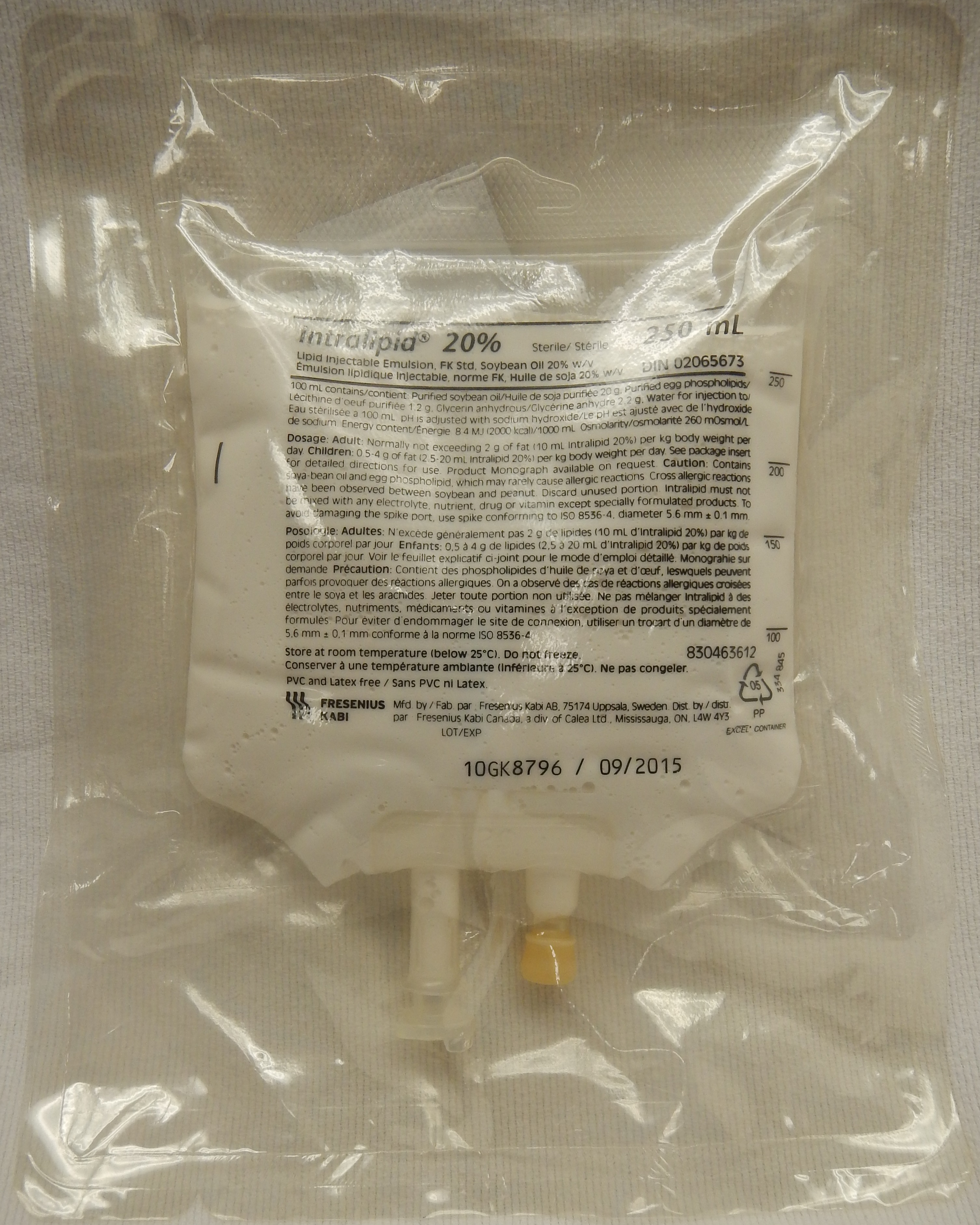
- A 20% lipid emulsion commonly used for calcium channel blocker toxicity
- Specialty: Emergency medicine
- Symptoms: Slow heart rate, low blood pressure, nausea, vomiting, sleepiness
- Complications: Cardiac arrest
- Usual onset: Within 6 hours
- Causes: Too much calcium channel blockers either by accident or on purpose
- Differential diagnosis: Beta blocker toxicity
- Treatment: Activated charcoal, whole bowel irrigation, intravenous fluids, calcium gluconate, glucagon, high dose insulin, vasopressors, lipid emulsion
- Prognosis: High risk of death
- Frequency: > 10,000 (US)

Calcium channel blocker toxicity is the taking of too much of the medications known as calcium channel blockers (CCBs), either by accident or on purpose. This often causes a slow heart rate and low blood pressure. This can progress to the heart stopping altogether. Some CCBs can also cause a fast heart rate as a result of the low blood pressure. Other symptoms may include nausea, vomiting, sleepiness, and shortness of breath. Symptoms usually occur in the first six hours but with some forms of the medication may not start for 24 hours or more.

There are a number of treatments that may be useful. These include efforts to reduce absorption of the drug including: activated charcoal taken by mouth if given shortly after the ingestion or whole bowel irrigation if an extended release formula was taken. Efforts to bring about vomiting are not recommended. Medications to treat the toxic effects include: intravenous fluids, calcium gluconate, glucagon, high dose insulin, vasopressors and lipid emulsion. Extracorporeal membrane oxygenation may also be an option.

More than ten thousand cases of calcium channel blocker toxicity were reported in the United States in 2010. Along with beta blockers and digoxin, calcium channel blockers have one of the highest rates of death in overdose. These medications first became available in the 1970s and 1980s. They are one of the few types of medication in which one pill can result in the death of a child.

== Signs and symptoms ==
Most people who have taken too much of a calcium channel blocker, especially diltiazem, get slow heart rate and low blood pressure (vasodilatory shock). This can progress to the heart stopping altogether. CCBs of the dihydropyridine group, as well as flunarizine, predominantly cause reflex tachycardia as a reaction to the low blood pressure.

Other potential symptoms include: nausea and vomiting, a decreased level of consciousness, and breathing difficulties. Symptoms usually begin within 6 hours of taking the medication by mouth. With extended release formulations symptoms may not occur for up to a day. Seizures are rare in adults but in children occur more often. Hypocalcaemia may also occur.

== Cause ==
Calcium channel blockers, also known as calcium channel antagonists, are widely used for a number of health conditions. Thus they are commonly present in many people's homes. In young children one pill may cause serious health problems and potentially death. The calcium channel blocker that caused the greatest number of deaths in 2010 in the United States was verapamil. This agent is believed to cause more heart problems than many of the others.

== Diagnosis ==
A blood or urine test to diagnose overdose is not generally available. CCB overdose may cause high blood sugar levels, and this is often a sign of how severe the problem will become.

=== Electrocardiogram ===
CCB toxicity can cause a number of electrocardiogram abnormalities with a low sinus rhythm being the most common. Others include: QT prolongation, bundle branch block, first-degree atrioventricular block, and even sinus tachycardia.

=== Differential ===
It may not be possible to tell the difference between beta blocker toxicity and calcium channel blocker overdose based on signs and symptoms.

== Management ==
The medical management of CCB toxicity may be difficult. It may not improve with the usual treatments used for a low blood pressure and a slow heart rate. Those who have no symptoms or signs six hours following taking an immediate release formulation and 24 hours after taking an extended release formulation generally need no further medical treatment.

=== Detoxification ===
Activated charcoal is recommended if it can be given within an hour or two of taking the calcium channel blockers. In those who have taken an extended release formulation of a CCB but are otherwise doing fine, whole bowel irrigation with polyethylene glycol may be useful. Causing vomiting by the use of medications such as ipecac is not recommended.

=== Insulin ===
High doses of intravenous insulin with glucose may be useful and are a first line treatment in overdoses. As this treatment may cause a drop in blood sugar and blood potassium levels, these should be monitored closely.

=== Other ===
Intravenous calcium gluconate or calcium chloride is considered a specific antidote. Slow heart rate can be treated with atropine and sympathomimetics. Low blood pressure is treated with vasopressors such as adrenaline.

There is tentative clinical evidence and good theoretical evidence of the benefit of lipid emulsion in severe overdoses of CCBs. Methylene blue may also be used for those with low blood pressure that does not respond to other treatments.

== Epidemiology ==
More than 10,000 cases of potential calcium channel blocker toxicity occurred in the United States in 2010. When death occurs in medicine overdose, heart medications are the cause more than 10% of time. The three most common types of heart medications that result in this outcome are calcium channel blockers along with beta blockers and digoxin.
