= Georges Moreau de Tours =

French painter

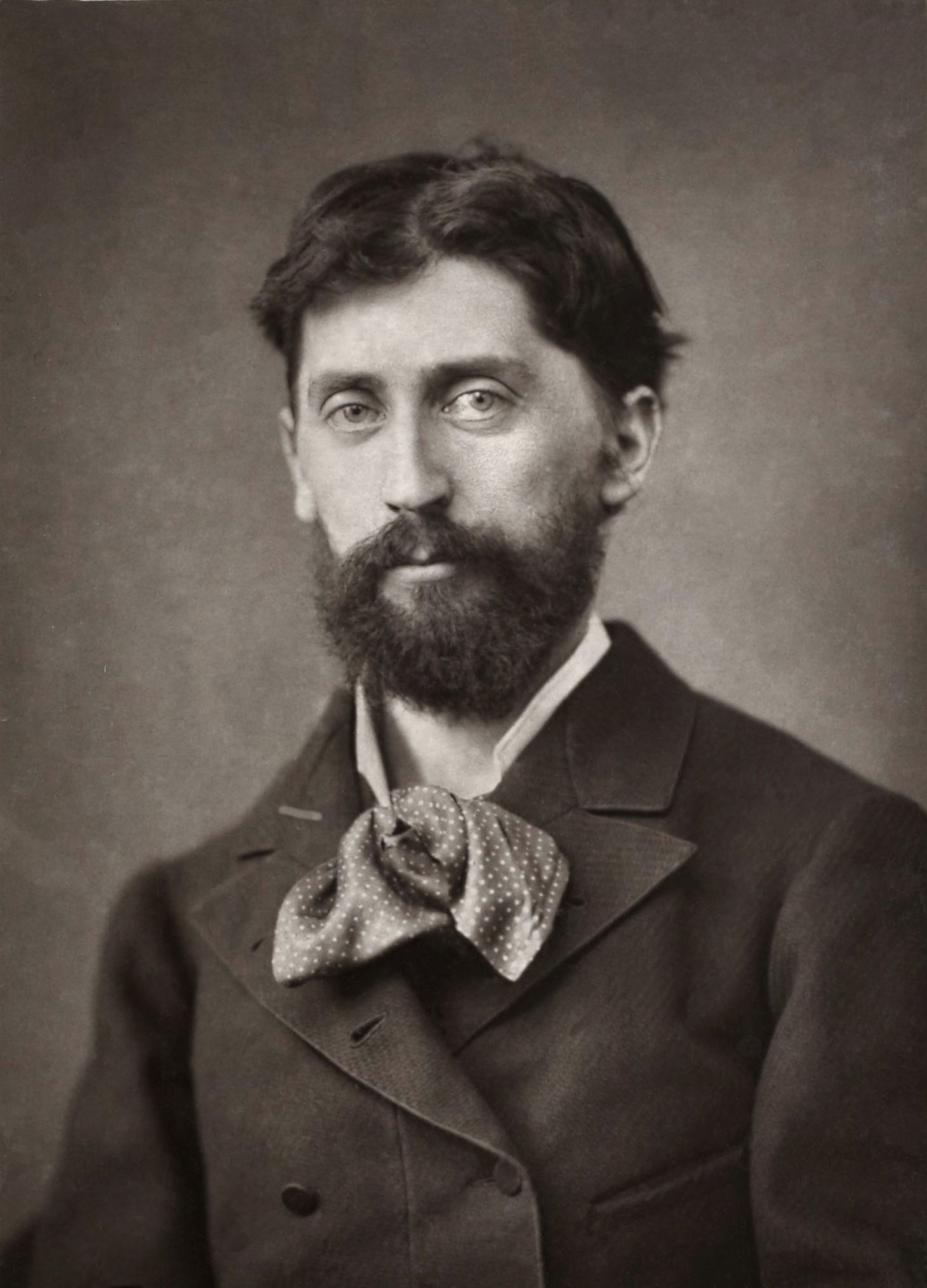
Georges Moreau de Tours (date unknown)

Georges Moreau de Tours (4 April 1848, Ivry-sur-Seine - 12 January 1901, Bois-le-Roi) was a French history painter and illustrator.

== Biography ==
His father was the psychiatrist Jacques-Joseph Moreau, who first suggested hemp as a treatment of mental illness. His brother, Paul Moreau de Tours, also became a psychiatrist and criminologist.

In 1865 he entered the École des Beaux-Arts, where he studied with Alexandre Cabanel. He was a regular exhibitor at the Salon from that time until 1896. In addition to his canvas paintings, he produced three scenes for the wedding chamber at the Town Hall in the Second Arrondissement.

The works he illustrated include Amy Robsart and Marie Tudor; dramas by Victor Hugo.

He was awarded the Légion d'honneur in 1892. A street in Bois-le-Roi is named after him. His wife Thérèse (a former student of his) was also a painter of some note.

== Selected works ==
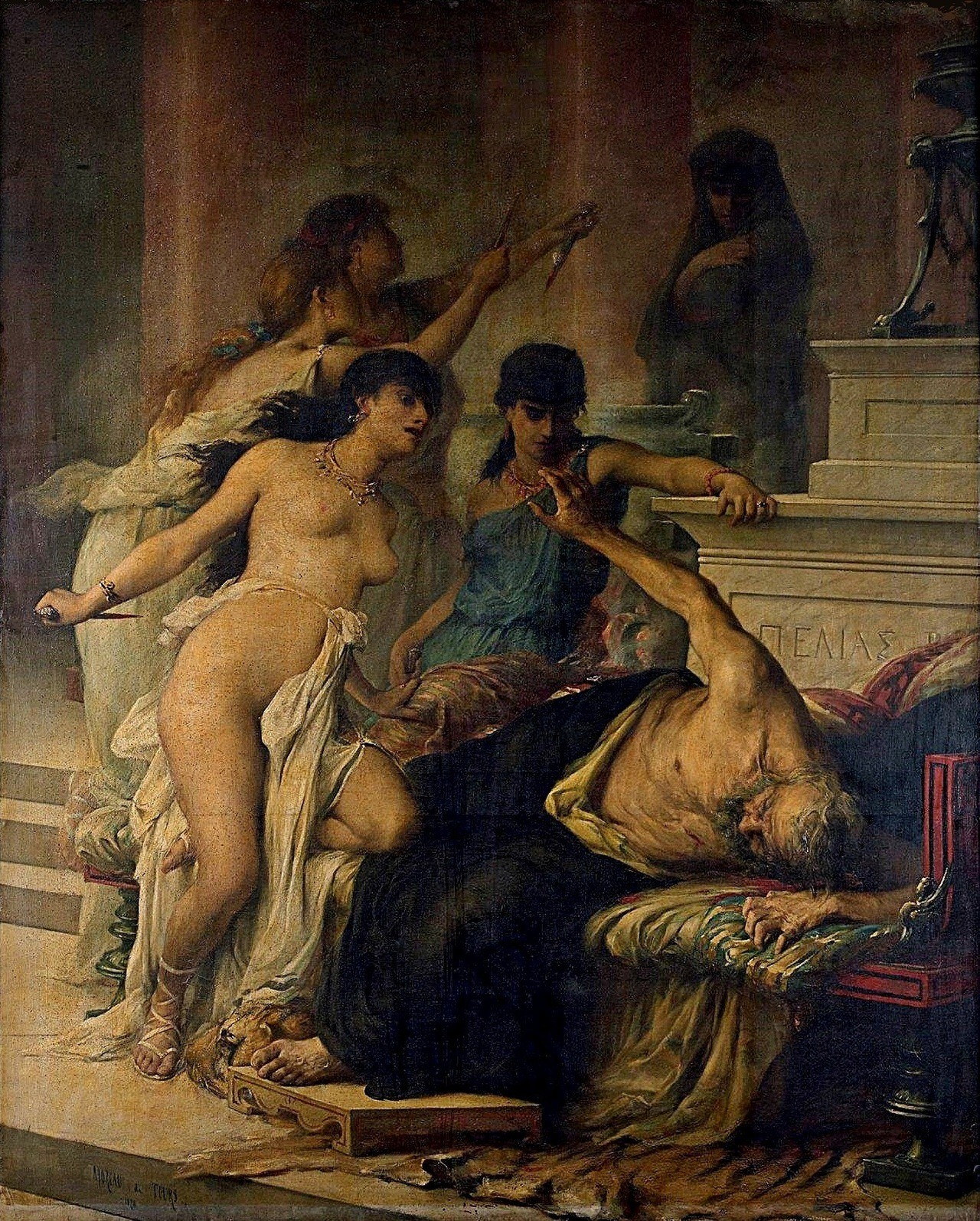
Pelias Murdered by His Daughters (1878)

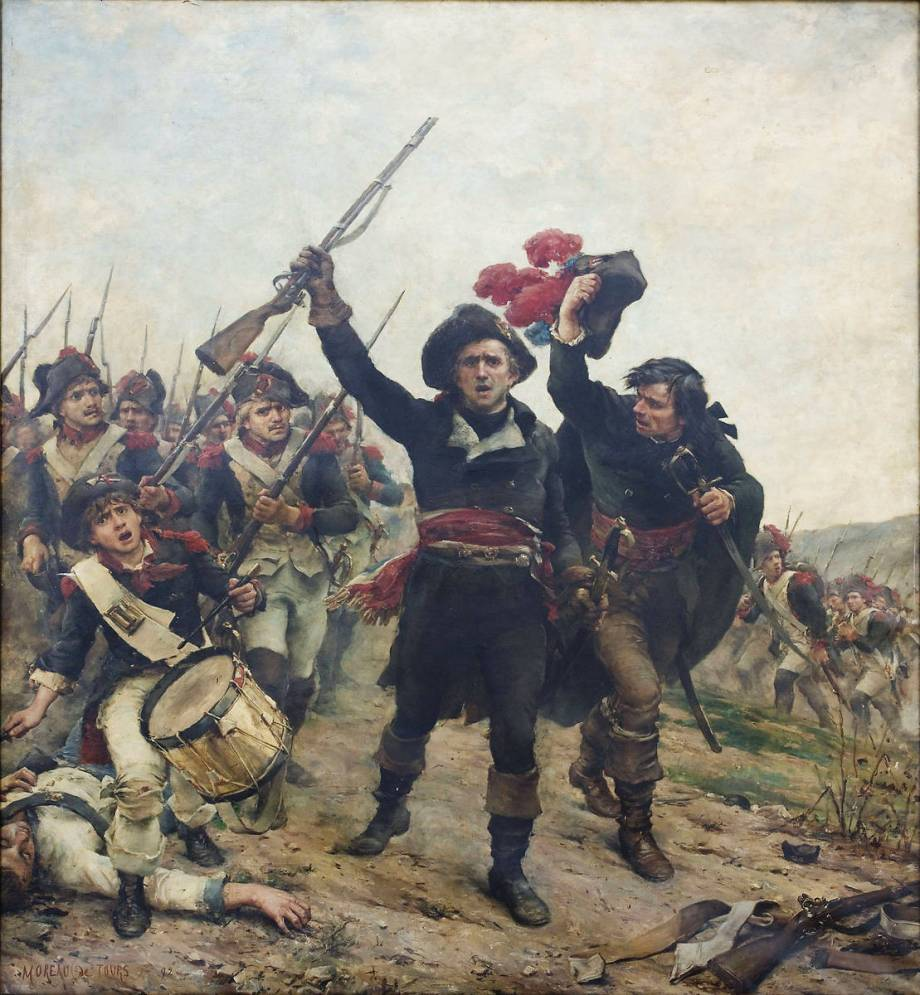
Lazare Carnot at Wattignies (1893)

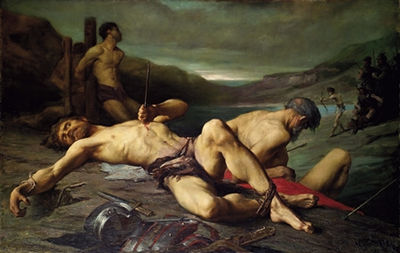
The Sons of Clovis (1877)

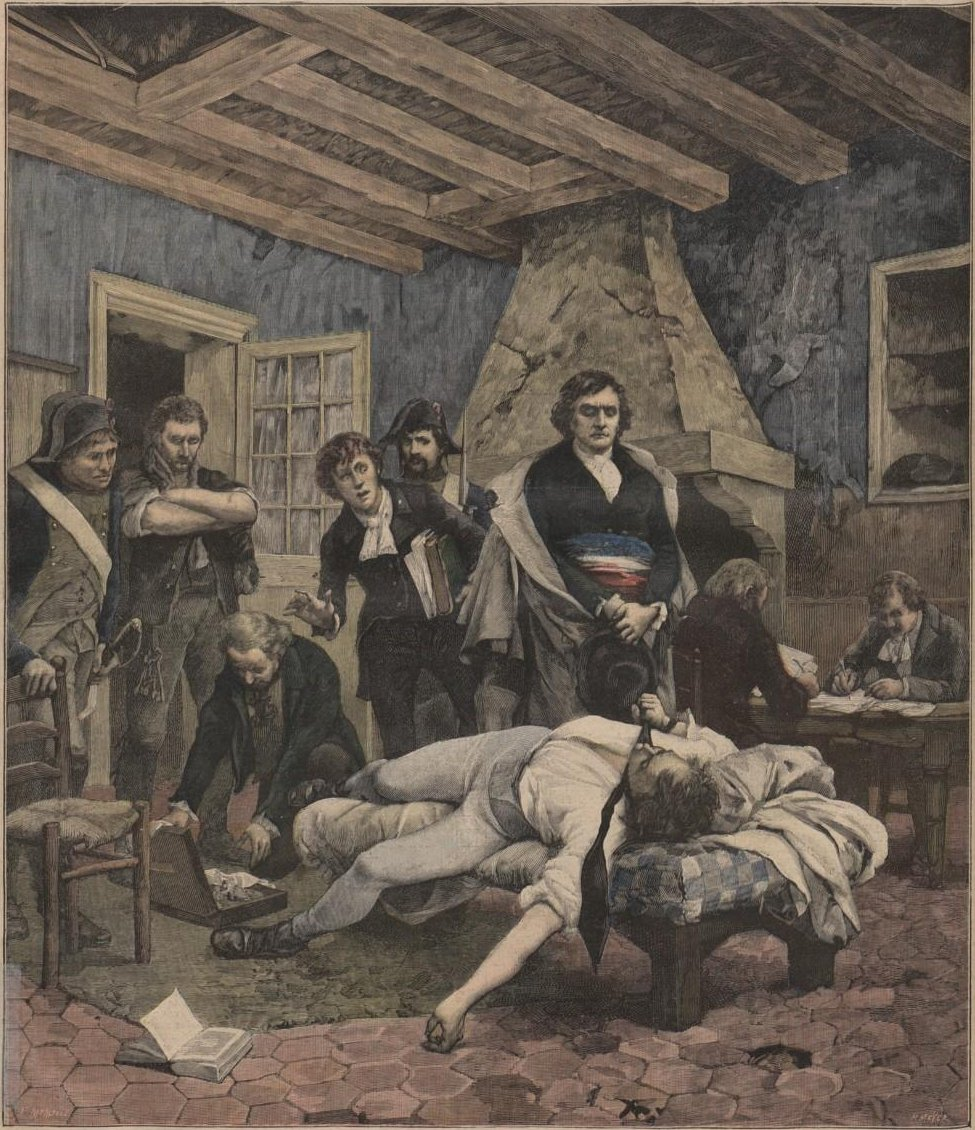
The Death of Pichegru (1891)
