= Hypocalcemia =

Low calcium levels in one's blood serum

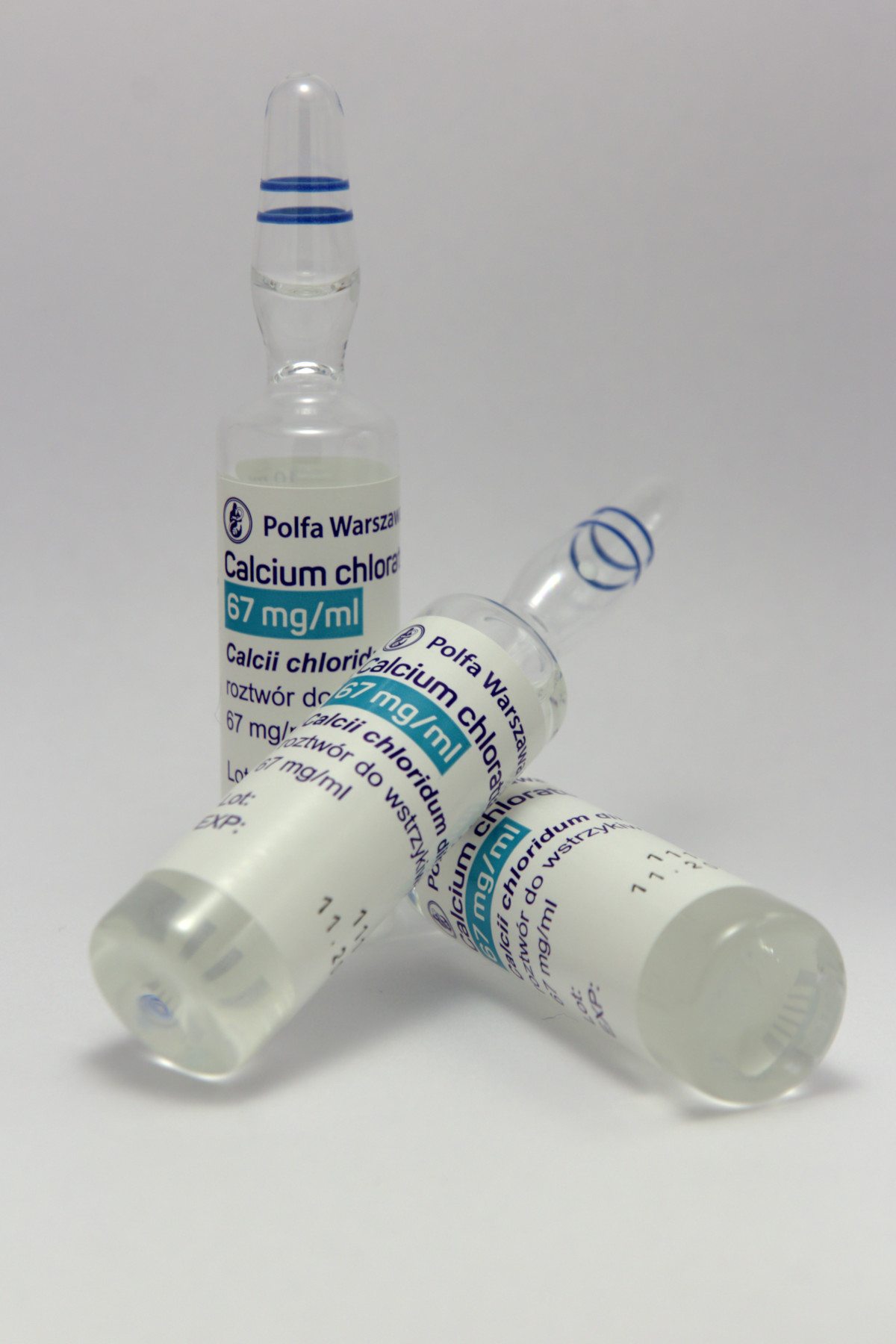
- Specialty: Endocrinology
- Symptoms: Numbness, muscle spasms, seizures, confusion
- Complications: Cardiac arrest
- Causes: Hypoparathyroidism, vitamin D deficiency, kidney failure, pancreatitis, calcium channel blocker overdose, rhabdomyolysis, tumor lysis syndrome, bisphosphonates
- Diagnostic method: Blood serum < 2.1 mmol/L (corrected calcium or ionized calcium)
- Treatment: Calcium supplements, vitamin D, magnesium sulfate.
- Frequency: ~18% of people in hospital

Hypocalcemia (US (Note: see spelling differences between US and Commonwealth English)) or hypocalcaemia (UK) is a medical condition characterized by low calcium levels in the blood serum. The normal range of blood calcium is typically between 2.1 and 2.6 mmol/L (8.8–10.7 mg/dL, 4.3–5.2 mEq/L), while levels less than 2.1 mmol/L are defined as hypocalcemic. Mildly low levels that develop slowly often have no symptoms. Otherwise symptoms may include numbness, muscle spasms, seizures, confusion, or in extreme cases cardiac arrest.

The most common cause for hypocalcemia is iatrogenic hypoparathyroidism. Other causes include other forms of hypoparathyroidism, vitamin D deficiency, kidney failure, pancreatitis, calcium channel blocker overdose, rhabdomyolysis, tumor lysis syndrome, and medications such as bisphosphonates or denosumab. Diagnosis should generally be confirmed by determining the corrected calcium or ionized calcium level. Specific changes may also be seen on an electrocardiogram (ECG).

Initial treatment for severe disease is with intravenous calcium chloride and possibly magnesium sulfate. Other treatments may include vitamin D, magnesium, and calcium supplements. If due to hypoparathyroidism, hydrochlorothiazide, phosphate binders, and a low salt diet may also be recommended. About 18% of people who are being treated in hospital have hypocalcemia.

== Signs and symptoms ==
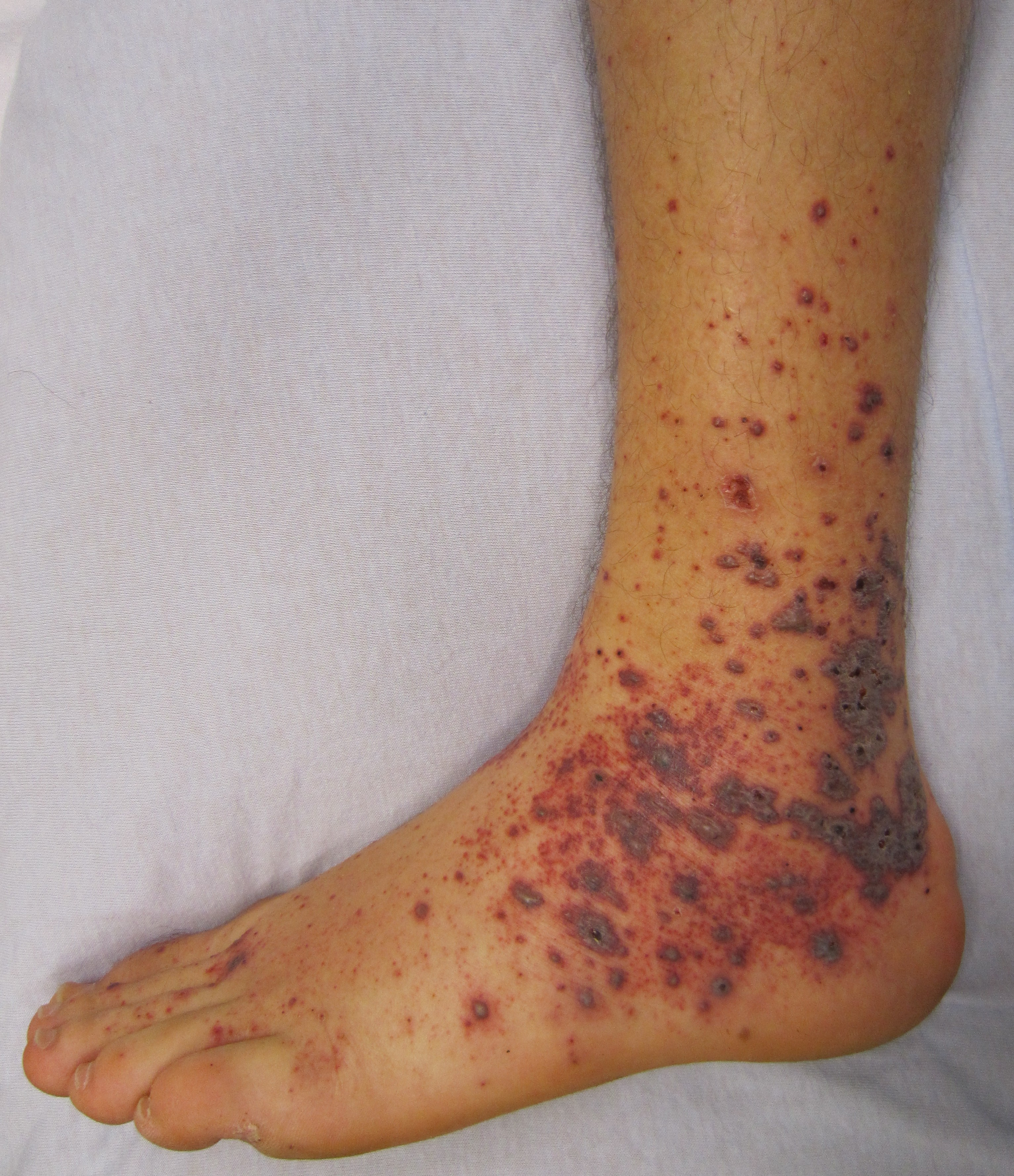
Purpura

The neuromuscular symptoms of hypocalcemia are caused by a positive bathmotropic effect (i.e. increased responsiveness) due to the decreased interaction of calcium with sodium channels. Since calcium blocks sodium channels and inhibits depolarization of nerve and muscle fibers, reduced calcium lowers the threshold for depolarization. The symptoms can be recalled by the mnemonic "CATs go numb" - convulsions, arrhythmias, tetany, and numbness in the hands and feet and around the mouth.

- Petechiae which appear as on-off spots, then later become confluent, and appear as purpura (larger bruised areas, usually in dependent regions of the body).
- Oral, perioral, and acral paresthesias, tingling or 'pins and needles' sensation in and around the mouth and lips, and in the extremities of the hands and feet. This is often the earliest symptom of hypocalcaemia.
- Carpopedal and generalized tetany (unrelieved and strong contractions of the hands, and in the large muscles of the rest of the body) are seen.
- Latent tetany
  - Trousseau sign of latent tetany (eliciting carpal spasm by inflating the blood pressure cuff and maintaining the cuff pressure above systolic)
  - Chvostek's sign (tapping of the inferior portion of the cheekbone will produce facial spasms)
- Tendon reflexes are hyperactive
- Life-threatening complications
  - Cardiac arrhythmias
- Effects on cardiac output
  - Negative chronotropic effect, or a decrease in heart rate.
  - Negative inotropic effect, or a decrease in contractility
- ECG changes include the following:
  - Intermittent QT prolongation, or intermittent prolongation of the QTc (corrected QT interval) on the ECG (electrocardiogram) is noted. The implications of intermittent QTc prolongation predispose to life-threatening cardiac electrical instability (and this is therefore a more critical condition than constant QTc prolongation). This type of electrical instability puts the person at high risk of torsades de pointes, a specific type of ventricular tachycardia which appears on an EKG (or ECG) as something that looks a bit like a sine wave with a regularly increasing and decreasing amplitude. (Torsades de pointes can cause death unless the person can be medically or electrically cardioverted and returned to a normal cardiac rhythm.)

== Causes ==
Hypoparathyroidism is a common cause of hypocalcemia. Calcium is tightly regulated by the parathyroid hormone (PTH). In response to low calcium levels, PTH levels rise, and conversely, if there are high calcium levels, then PTH secretion declines. However, in the setting of absent, decreased, or ineffective PTH hormone, the body loses this regulatory function, and hypocalcemia ensues. Hypoparathyroidism is commonly due to surgical destruction of the parathyroid glands. Hypoparathyroidism may also be due to an autoimmune problem. Some causes of hypocalcaemia are as follows:

- Hyperphosphatemia
- Vitamin D deficiency
- Chronic liver disease
- Edetate disodium
- Magnesium deficiency
- Prolonged use of medications/laxatives (magnesium)
- Osteomalacia
- Chronic kidney failure
- Ineffective active vitamin D
- Hypoparathyroidism/genetic
- After surgery hypoparathyroidism
- Hungry bone syndrome
- Tumour lysis syndrome
- Acute kidney injury
- Rhabdomyolysis (initial stage)
- As a complication of pancreatitis
- Alkalosis
- Massive red blood cell transfusion due to excess citrate in the blood
- As blood plasma hydrogen ion concentration decreases, caused by respiratory or metabolic alkalosis, the concentration of freely ionized calcium, the biologically active component of blood calcium, decreases. Because a portion of both hydrogen ions and calcium are bound to serum albumin, when blood becomes alkalotic, the bound hydrogen ions dissociate from albumin, freeing up the albumin to bind with more calcium and thereby decreasing the freely ionized portion of total serum calcium. For every 0.1 increase in pH, ionized calcium decreases by about 0.05 mmol/L. This hypocalcaemia related to alkalosis is partially responsible for the cerebral vasoconstriction that causes the lightheadedness, fainting, and paraesthesia often seen with hyperventilation.
- Neonatal hypocalcemia
- Gain of function mutations of the calcium-sensing receptor
- Foscarnet use
- Loop diuretic use
- Crohn's disease
- High level of lactic acid in the blood
- Pseudohypoparathyroidism
- Trauma

== Pathophysiology ==
Physiologically, blood calcium is tightly regulated within a narrow range for proper cellular processes. Calcium in the blood exists in three primary states: bound to proteins (mainly albumin), bound to anions such as phosphate and citrate, and as free (unbound) ionized calcium. Only the unbound ionized calcium is physiologically active. Normal blood calcium level is between 8.5 and 10.5 mg/dL (2.12 to 2.62 mmol/L) and that of unbound calcium is 4.65 to 5.25 mg/dL (1.16 to 1.31 mmol/L).

=== Mechanism ===
Extracellular Ca^{2+} levels modulate the opening propensity of voltage-gated sodium channels, presumably by binding onto the external aspect of the channel, thus altering the local electrical charge at the channel. With decreasing extracellular Ca^{2+} levels, Na^{+} channels will be able open at progressively more negative membrane potentials, causing nervous overexcitability. When extracellular Ca^{2+} concentrations reach half of normal, overexcitability of the Na^{+} channels becomes sufficient to cause some peripheral nerves to begin discharging spontaneously.

== Diagnosis ==
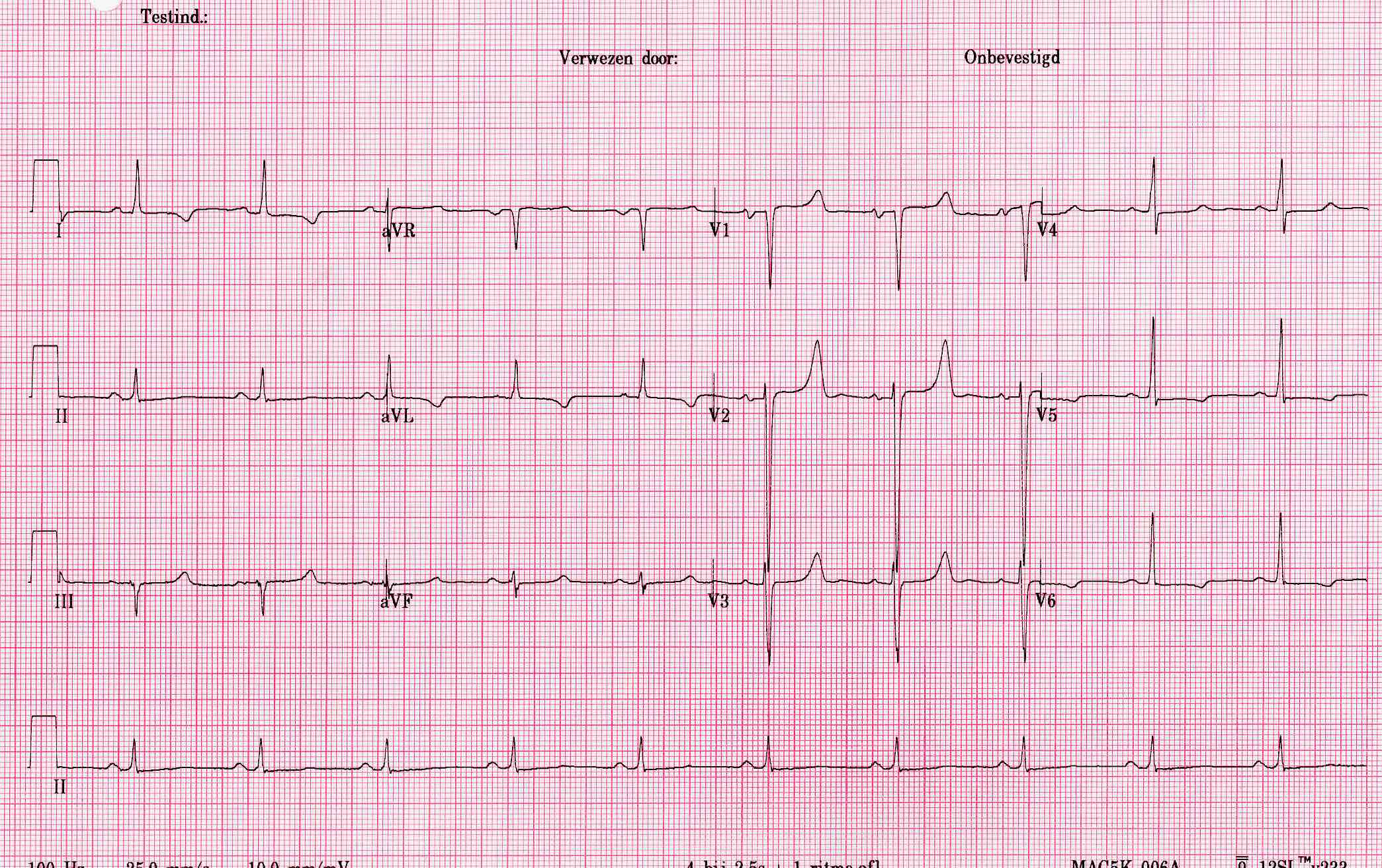
An ECG of a person with hypocalcemia

Because a significant portion of calcium is bound to albumin, any alteration in the level of albumin will affect the measured level of calcium. A corrected calcium level based on the albumin level is: Corrected calcium (mg/dL) = measured total Ca (mg/dL) + 0.8 * (4.0 - serum albumin [g/dL]).Since calcium is also bound to small anions, it may be more useful to correct total calcium for both albumin and the anion gap.

== Management ==
Management of this condition includes:

- Intravenous calcium gluconate 10% can be administered, or if the hypocalcaemia is severe, calcium chloride is given instead. This is only appropriate if the hypocalcemia is acute and has occurred over a relatively short time frame. But if the hypocalcemia has been severe and chronic, then this regimen can be fatal, because there is a degree of acclimatization that occurs. The neuromuscular excitability, cardiac electrical instability, and associated symptoms are then not cured or relieved by prompt administration of corrective doses of calcium but rather exacerbated. Such rapid administration of calcium would result in effective over-correction – symptoms of hypercalcemia would follow.
- However, in either circumstance, maintenance doses of both calcium and vitamin D (often as 1,25-(OH)_{2}-D_{3}, i.e., calcitriol) are often necessary to prevent further decline.

== See also ==
- Milk fever (hypocalcemia in animals)
- Calcium deficiency (plant disorder)
- Hypomagnesemia with secondary hypocalcemia
