= Saint-Georges-sur-Cher =

- Commune
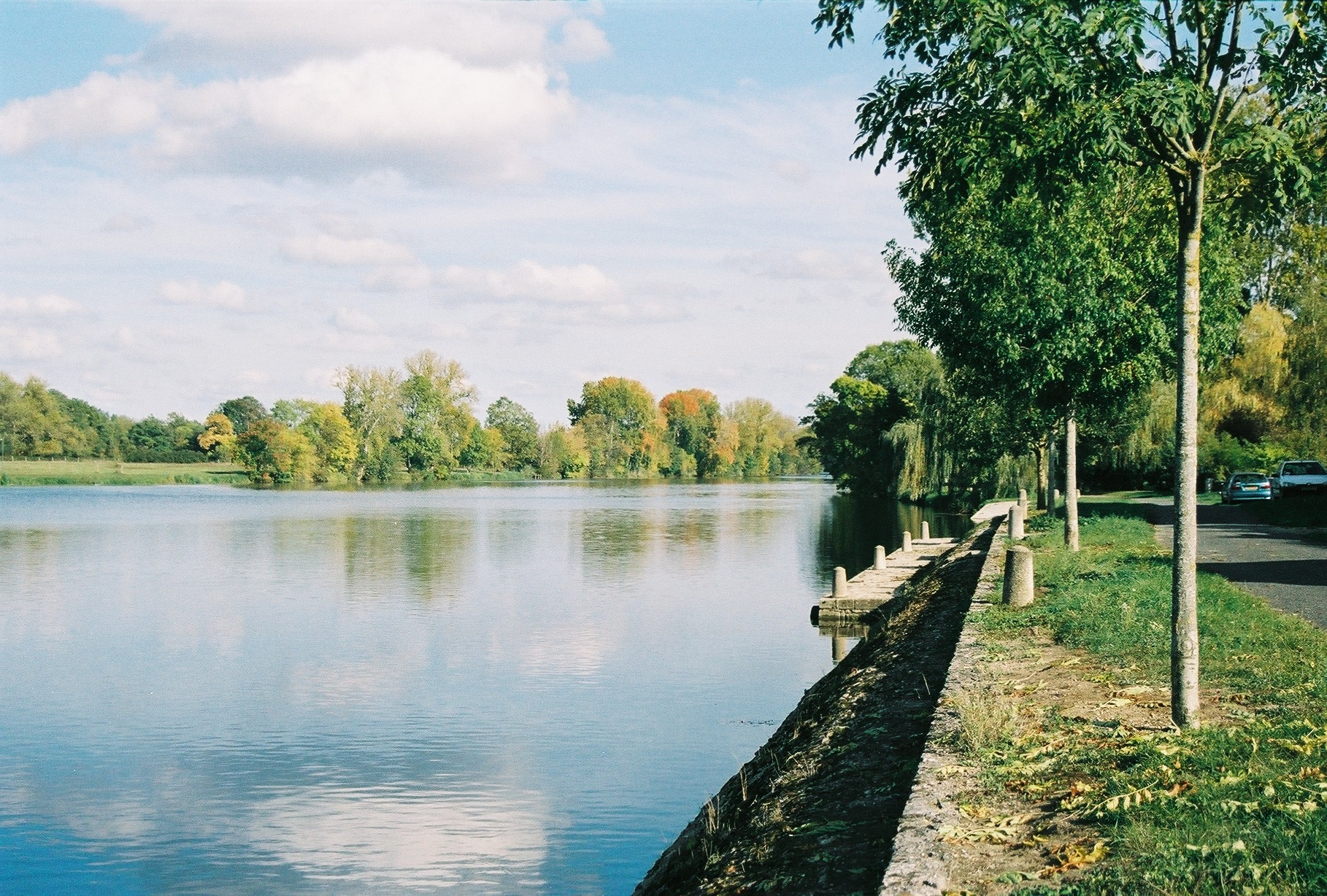
- Cher River

- Coat of arms
- Location of Saint-Georges-sur-Cher
- Location within France Location within Centre-Val de Loire
- Coordinates: 47°19′33″N 1°07′34″E
- Country: France
- Region: Centre-Val de Loire
- Department: Loir-et-Cher
- Arrondissement: Romorantin-Lanthenay
- Canton: Montrichard Val de Cher

Government
  - Mayor (2020–2026): Jacques Paoletti
- Area^{1}: 23.78 km^{2} (9.18 sq mi)
- Elevation: 111 m (364 ft)
- Highest elevation: 141 m (463 ft)
- Lowest elevation: 56 m (184 ft)
- Population (2023): 2,710
  - Density: 114/km^{2} (295/sq mi)
- Time zone: UTC+01:00 (CET)
  - Summer (DST): UTC+02:00 (CEST)
- INSEE/Postal code: 41211 /41400
- ^{1} French Land Register data, which excludes lakes, ponds, glaciers > 1 km^{2} (0.386 sq mi or 247 acres) and river estuaries.

Saint-Georges-sur-Cher (French pronunciation: [sɛ̃ ʒɔʁʒ syʁ ʃɛʁ], literally Saint-Georges on Cher) is a commune in the Loir-et-Cher department of central France.

== Population ==
Historical population

| Year | Pop. | ±% p.a. |
|---|---|---|
| 1793 | 1,312 | — |
| 1821 | 1,681 | +0.89% |
| 1846 | 2,115 | +0.92% |
| 1872 | 2,350 | +0.41% |
| 1901 | 2,139 | −0.32% |
| 1926 | 1,895 | −0.48% |
| 1946 | 1,688 | −0.58% |
| 1962 | 1,647 | −0.15% |
| 1968 | 1,673 | +0.26% |

| Year | Pop. | ±% p.a. |
|---|---|---|
| 1975 | 1,783 | +0.91% |
| 1982 | 2,021 | +1.81% |
| 1990 | 2,047 | +0.16% |
| 1999 | 2,155 | +0.57% |
| 2007 | 2,303 | +0.83% |
| 2012 | 2,557 | +2.11% |
| 2017 | 2,691 | +1.03% |
| 2023 | 2,710 | +0.12% |

Source: EHESS and INSEE (1968-2023)

== See also ==
- Communes of the Loir-et-Cher department
