= Chvostek sign =

Clinical sign of low blood calcium level

The Chvostek sign (/ˈkvɒstɪk/) is a clinical sign that someone may have a low blood calcium level (a decreased serum calcium, called hypocalcemia). The Chvostek sign is the abnormal twitching of muscles that are activated (innervated) by the facial nerve (also known as Cranial Nerve Seven, or CNVII). When the facial nerve is tapped in front of the ear, the facial muscles on the same side of the face will contract sporadically (called ipsilateral facial spasm). The muscles that control the nose, lips and eyebrows are often the ones that will spasm.

These facial spasms are caused by the nerves that control the muscle being easily excited (called hyperexcitability) due to hypocalcemia. Hypocalcemia can be caused by many things, including parathyroid conditions (such as when the parathyroid gland does not function well, called hypoparathyroidism) and vitamin diseases (such as a vitamin D deficiency). Sometimes, the Chvostek sign can be caused by other conditions which interfere with the balance of calcium, such as imbalanced acid and alkaline in blood causing respiratory alkalosis (an alkaline blood pH).

The Trousseau sign of latent tetany is another sign of decreased calcium in blood where muscles in the hand contract when the brachial artery supplying the area is occluded. The Trousseau sign of latent tetany also generally occurs earlier than the Chvostek sign and is a more accurate predictor of hypocalcemia, allowing clinicians to recognise the condition earlier.

== Etymology ==
The sign is named after František Chvostek, a Czech-born Austrian surgeon. In his professional life, Chvostek devoted himself to the study of etiopathogenesis and to the treatment of neurological disorders, including by means of electrotherapy. In 1876, he first described the sign that bears his name. Later it was independently described by another Austrian physician, Nathan Weiss (1851–1883), in 1883.

== Features ==
=== Chvostek sign – type I ===
It is obtained by striking with a finger or a hammer a point that is approximately 2 cm in front of the lobe of the ear and about 1 cm below the zygomatic process. Response occurs in the form of ipsilateral contraction of some or all of the muscles innervated by the facial nerve. The effect is the lateral deviation of the labial and nasal fold toward the stimulated side.

=== Chvostek sign – type II ===
Hitting a point between the middle third and upper third of the line joining the angle of the mouth to the zygomatic process gives rise to only a contraction of the muscles of the mouth and nose.

== Causes ==
Chvostek's sign is found in tetany. However, it may also be present in hypomagnesemia. Magnesium is a cofactor for adenylate cyclase, which catalyzes the conversion of ATP to 3',5'-cyclic AMP. The 3',5'-cyclic AMP (cAMP) is required for parathyroid hormone activation. It is frequently seen in alcoholics, persons with diarrhea, patients taking aminoglycosides or diuretics, because hypomagnesemia can cause hypocalcemia. It is also seen in measles, tetanus and myxedema.

It can also be found in subjects with respiratory alkalosis, for example as a result of hyperventilation syndrome, which can lead to a drastic reduction of the concentration in serum of calcium ions while at normal levels, for the binding of a significant proportion of ionized calcium (Ca^{2+}) with albumin and globulins.

== Clinical significance ==
Chvostek's sign is not a very specific sign of tetany as it may be seen in 10% to 25% of healthy adults. It is therefore not a reliable clinical sign for diagnosing latent tetany. The sensitivity is lower than that in the corresponding Trousseau sign as it is negative in 30% of patients with hypocalcemia. Due to the combination of poor sensitivity and specificity the clinical utility of this sign is reduced.
