= Alfred-Armand-Louis-Marie Velpeau =

French anatomist and surgeon (1795–1867)

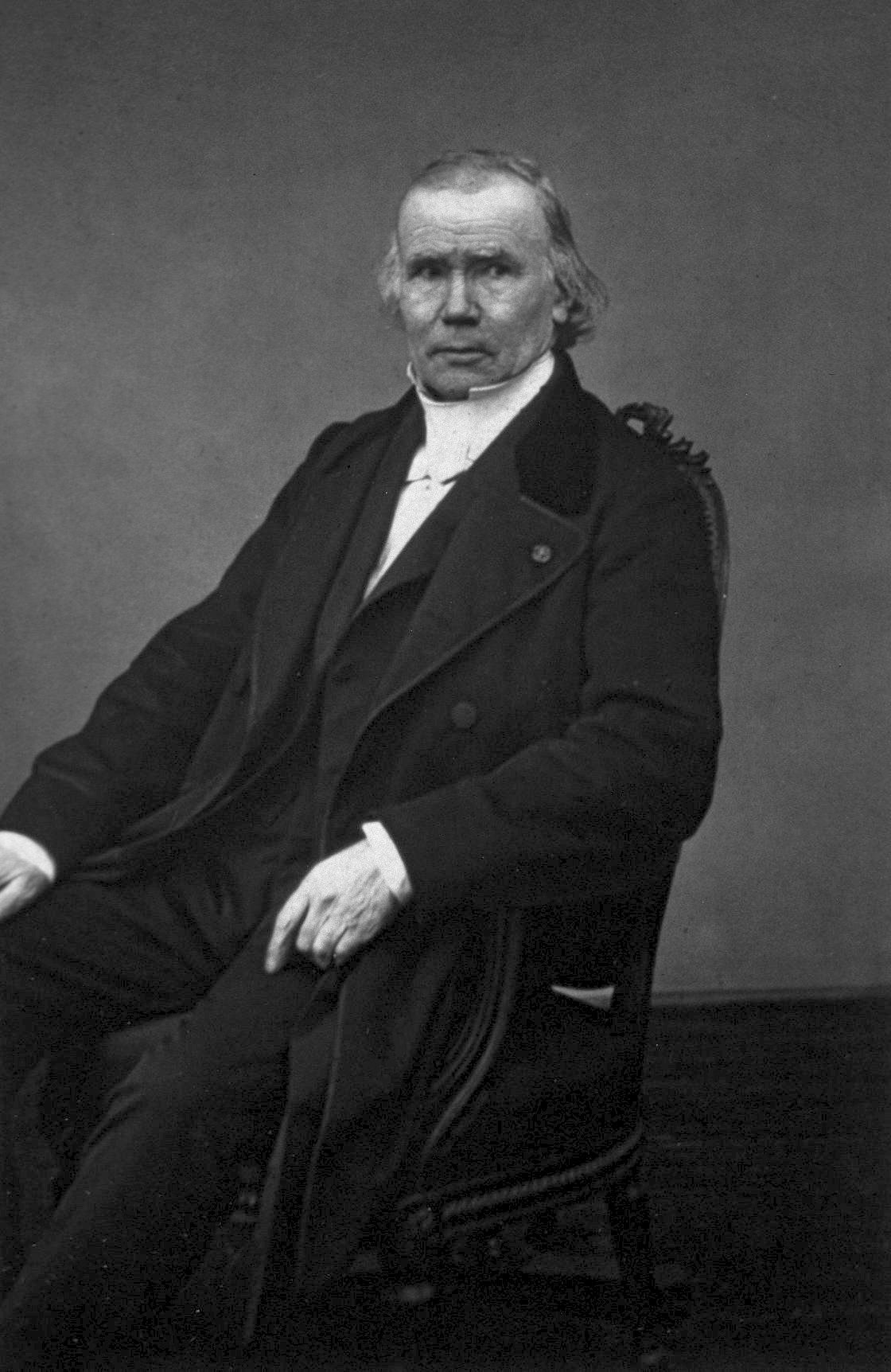
Alfred Velpeau

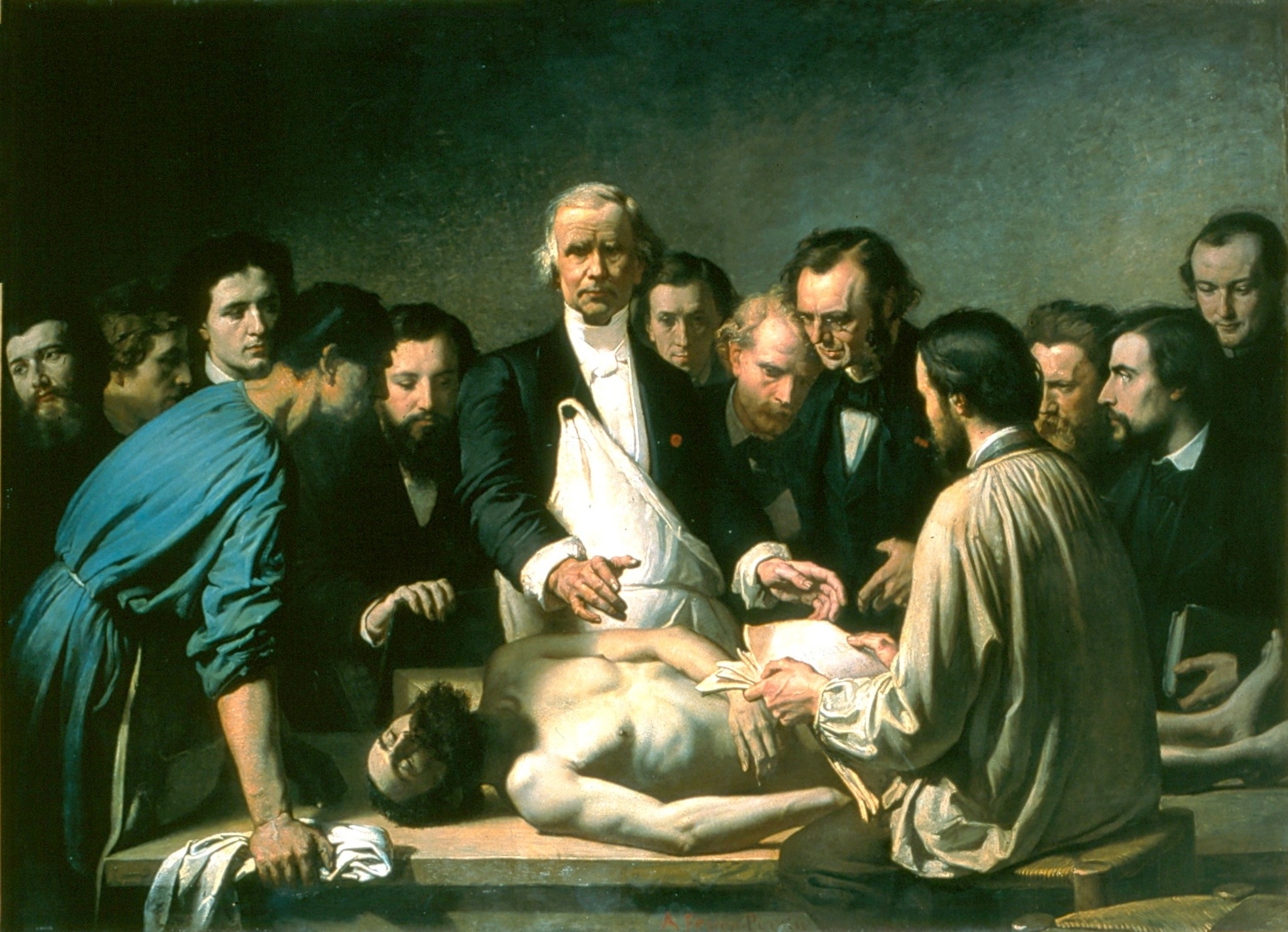
La Leçon d'anatomie de Velpeau à la Charité by Auguste Feyen-Perrin.

Alfred-Armand-Louis-Marie Velpeau (18 May 1795 – 24 August 1867) was a French anatomist and surgeon.

== Biography ==
A native of Brèches, Indre-et-Loire, he served as a student and assistant to Pierre Bretonneau (1778–1862) in Tours. In 1823 he obtained his doctorate in Paris, where he subsequently worked as a hospital surgeon. Following the death of Alexis de Boyer (1757–1833), he was appointed chair of clinical surgery, a position he maintained until his death in 1867.

In 1843 he succeeded Dominique Jean Larrey (1766–1842) at the Académie des sciences (section of medicine and surgery). Ramón Emeterio Betances, Puerto Rican pro-independence leader, surgeon and Légion d'honneur laureate, was one of Velpeau's prominent students.

== Accomplishments in medicine ==
Velpeau was a skilled surgeon and renowned for his knowledge of surgical anatomy. He was the author of over 340 titles on surgery, embryology, anatomy, obstetrics, inter alia. Among his better known written efforts was a work on obstetrics, titled Traité elementaire de l’art des accouchements: ou, Principes de tokologie et d'embryologie (1829). Shortly afterwards, it was translated into English and issued as "An elementary treatise on midwifery: or Principles of tocology and embryology" (1831). A second French edition was published in 1835 with the title Traité complet de l'art des accouchements, etc. Other works by Velpeau that have been translated into English are: Nouveaux éléments de médecine opératoire (1832) as "New elements of operative surgery" (1856) and Traité des maladies du sein et de la région mammaire as "A treatise on the diseases of the breast and mammary region" (1856).

He is credited with providing the first accurate description of leukemia (1827). A wrapping used to immobilize the arm to the chest wall is known as a "Velpeau bandage". There are several other medical terms associated with his name, however these terms are now primarily used for historical purposes only; these include: "Velpeau hernia" for the femoral hernia, "Velpeau's disease" for hidradenitis suppurativa, "Velpeau's canal" for the inguinal canal and "Velpeau's fossa", also known as the ischiorectal fossa.

Despite being one of the top surgeons in his time, Velpeau believed that pain-free surgery was a fantasy, and that surgery and pain were inseparable. With the advent of anaesthetics such as ether and chloroform in the 1840s, Velpeau was amazed, saying "On the subject of ether, that it is a wonderful and terrible agent, I will say of chloroform, that it is still more wonderful and more terrible".
