= Trousseau sign of latent tetany =

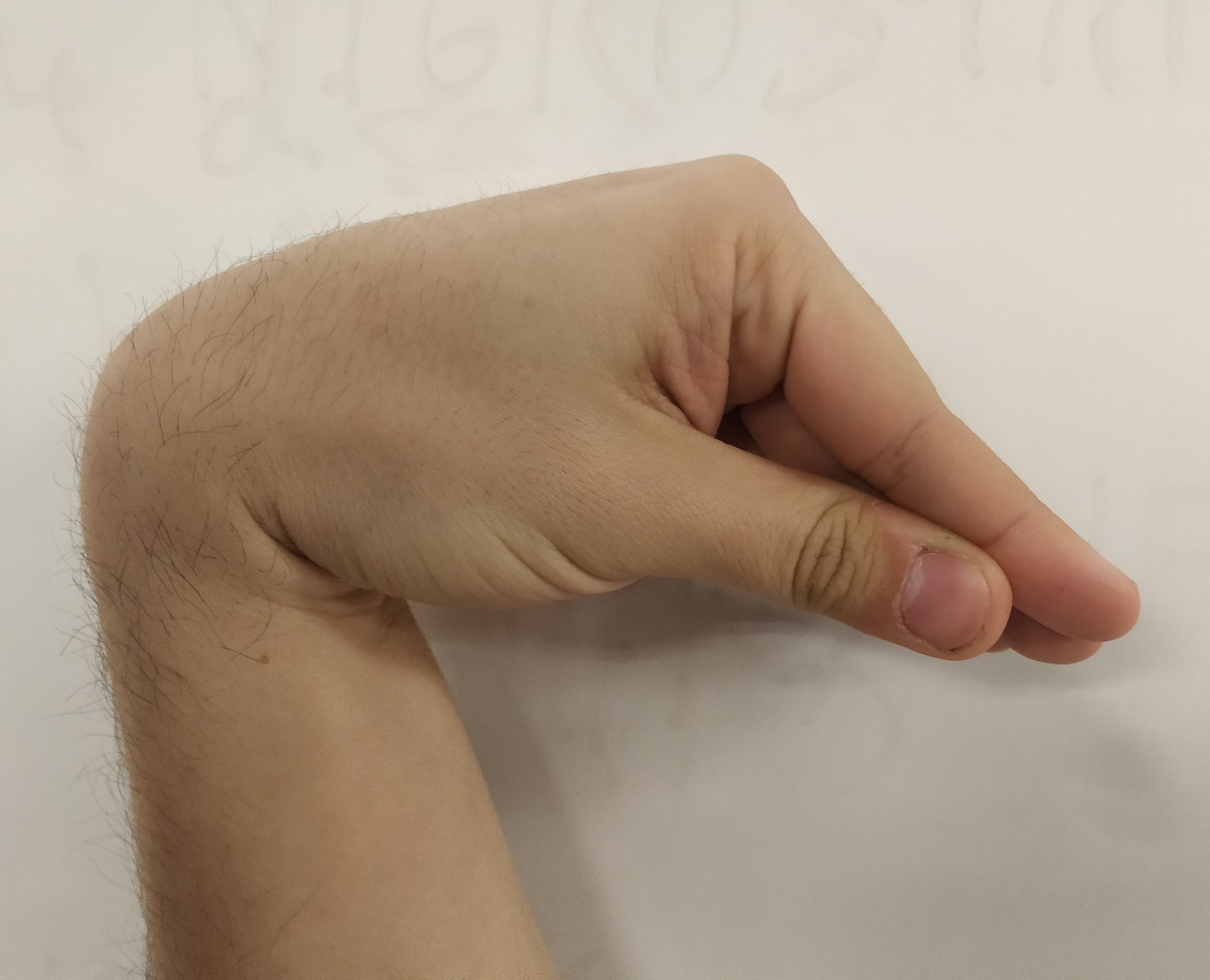
- The flexed wrist and metacarpophalangeal joint, and the extended distal and proximal interphalangeal joint are characteristic of Trousseau sign of latent tetany.
- Test of: Hypocalcemia

Trousseau sign of latent tetany is a medical sign observed in patients with low calcium. From 1 to 4 percent of normal patients will test positive for Trousseau's sign of latent tetany. This sign may be positive before other manifestations of hypocalcemia such as hyperreflexia and tetany, as such it is generally believed to be more sensitive (94%) than the Chvostek sign (29%) for hypocalcemia. This sign may also be observed as a symptom of hyperventilation syndrome as a result of hypocapnia-induced reduction of calcium levels in the blood.

To elicit the sign, a blood pressure cuff is placed around the arm and inflated to a pressure greater than the systolic blood pressure and held in place for 3 minutes. This will occlude the brachial artery. In the absence of blood flow, the patient's hypocalcemia and subsequent neuromuscular irritability will induce spasm of the muscles of the hand and forearm. The wrist and metacarpophalangeal joints flex, the DIP and PIP joints extend, and the fingers adduct. The sign is also known as main d'accoucheur (French for "hand of the obstetrician") because it supposedly resembles the position of an obstetrician's hand in delivering a baby.

== History ==
The sign is named after French physician Armand Trousseau, who described the phenomenon in 1861. It is distinct from the Trousseau sign of malignancy, which is a type of abnormal blood clot due to certain types of cancer.
