= Armand Trousseau =

French physician

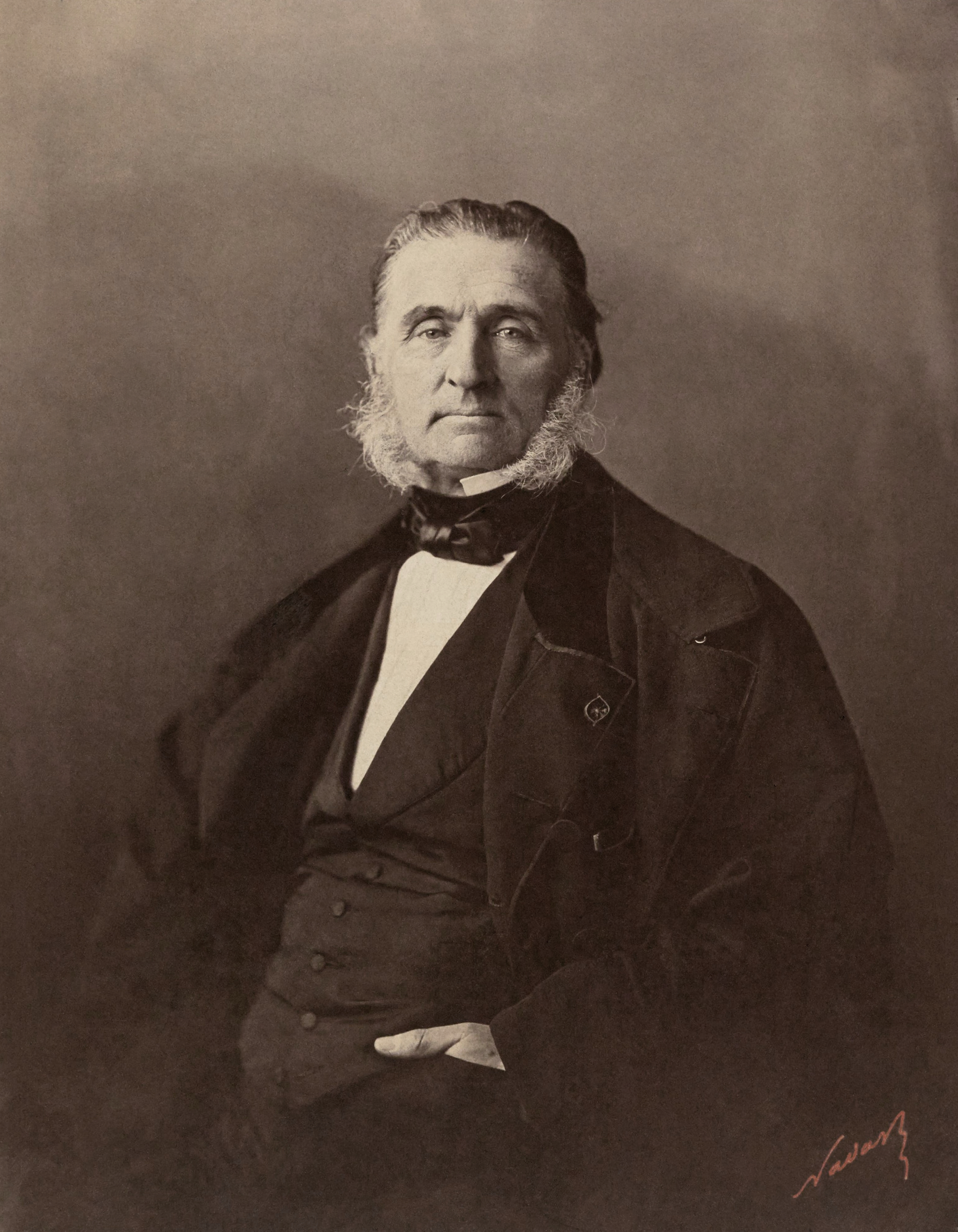
- Armand Trousseau.
- Born: 14 October 1801; Tours, Indre-et-Loire, France
- Died: 23 June 1867 (aged 65); Paris, France
- Occupations: Physician, Internist
- Known for: Trousseau sign of malignancy, Trousseau sign of latent tetany, Trousseau-Lallemand bodies
- Children: Georges Phillipe Trousseau

Armand Trousseau (French pronunciation: [aʁmɑ̃ tʁuso]; 14 October 1801 – 23 June 1867) was a French internist. His contributions to medicine include Trousseau sign of malignancy, Trousseau sign of latent tetany, Trousseau–Lallemand bodies (an archaic synonym for Bence Jones proteins). He is sometimes credited with the quip "use new drugs quickly, while they still work", though Michel-Philippe Bouvart had said the same over 40 years earlier.

== Biography ==
A native of Tours, Indre-et-Loire, Armand Trousseau began his medical studies in his native town as a pupil of Pierre Fidele Bretonneau at the local general hospital. He later continued his studies in Paris, where he received his doctorate in 1825 and became adjunct faculty in 1827. In 1828, the French government assigned him to investigate epidemics ravaging some parts of southern France. After completing his mission the same year, Trousseau travelled to Gibraltar as a member of a commission to investigate yellow fever. This work, and a monograph on laryngeal phthisis, led to his early recognition in Paris.

In 1830 Trousseau became Médecin des hôpitaux through concours, and in 1832 received a position in public health with the central bureau while working as a physician in the Hôtel-Dieu under Joseph Claude Anthelme Récamier. In 1837 he received the great prize of the academy. In 1839 he was appointed physician at the Hôpital St. Antoine and eventually became Chair of therapy and pharmacology at the Paris medical faculty. In 1850 he assumed the Chair of clinical medicine and again commenced working in the Hôtel-Dieu. He was also active in politics, particularly after the French Revolution of 1848, holding several positions including being a member of the legislative body. During his later years Trousseau developed gastric cancer. Coincidentally, he previously described Trousseau sign of malignancy and developed a similar finding in himself. This cancer limited his activities and eventually proved fatal.

== Legacy ==
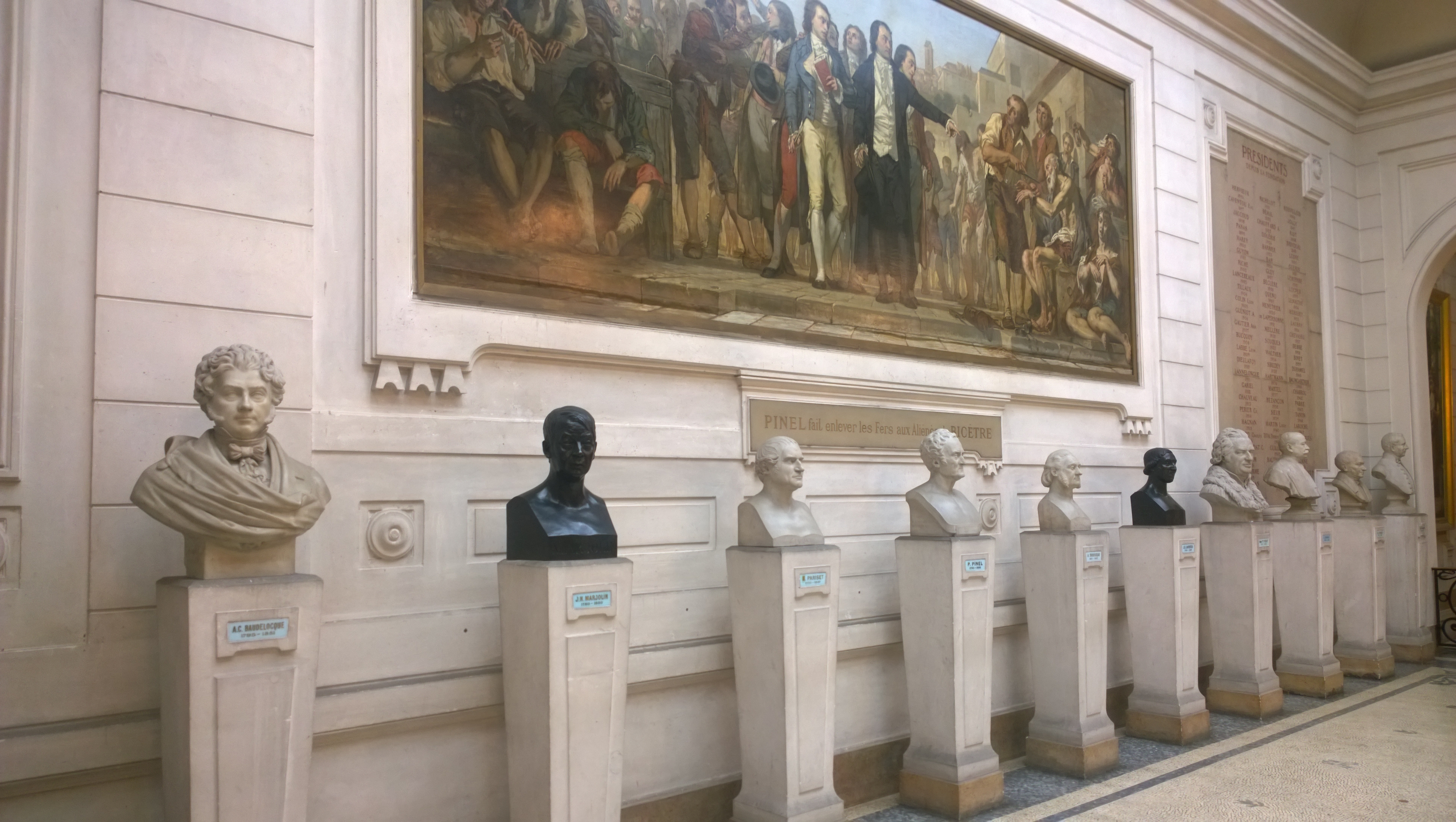
Busts at the Académie Nationale de Médecine, with Trousseau fifth from the left

Trousseau was instrumental in creating new modes of treatment of croup, emphysema, pleurisy, goiter, and malaria. He received the prize of the French Academy of Medicine for his classic essay on laryngology which originally appeared in 1837. He was the first in France to perform a tracheotomy, and he wrote a monograph on this as well as intubation in 1851. His textbooks on clinical medicine and therapeutics were both extremely popular and translated into English. Trousseau coined the terms aphasia and forme fruste and popularized eponyms in disease description such as Addison's disease and Hodgkin's lymphoma.

In 1833, Trousseau invented the Trousseau Tracheal Dilator, a blunt-nosed forceps designed to allow easier access to a tracheostomy stoma.

Trousseau was considered an outstanding teacher. Numerous students of his achieved fame in their own right, including Puerto Rican pro-independence leader, surgeon and Légion d'honneur laureate, Ramón Emeterio Betances. Trousseau’s son Georges Phillipe Trousseau (1833–1894) became the royal doctor of the Kingdom of Hawaii, and Armand's grandson was the distinguished ophthalmologist Armand Henri Trousseau (1856–1910).
