= Paul Moreau de Tours =

French psychiatrist

Paul Moreau de Tours (5 July 1844 – 29 December 1908, in Ivry-sur-Seine) was a French psychiatrist, best remembered for his books On the Contagion of Suicide: About the Current Epidemic (1875) and Jealous madness (1877), among others. He served as director of the Ivry-sur-Seine Nursing Home. He was a brother of the painter Georges Moreau de Tours.
