= List of museums in Hawaii =

This list of museums in Hawaii contains museums which are defined for this context as institutions (including nonprofit organizations, government entities, and private businesses) that collect and care for objects of cultural, artistic, scientific, or historical interest and make their collections or related exhibits available for public viewing. Non-profit and university art galleries are also included. Museums that exist only in cyberspace (virtual museums) are not included.

== Active museums ==
Name	Location	Island	Subject	Summary
Alexander & Baldwin Sugar Museum	Kahului	Maui	Industry	Hawaiian sugar plantation history and heritage
Anna Ranch	Kamuela	Big Island	Historic house	Historic ranch
ARTS at Marks Garage	Honolulu	Oahu	Art	website
Astronaut Ellison S. Onizuka Space Center	North Kona	Big Island	Science	Located at Kona International Airport, space science and artifacts of astronaut Ellison Onizuka
Bailey House Museum	Wailuku	Maui	Multiple	Historic 19th century house museum with Hawaiian history and art, collection of land snails
Baldwin Home Museum	Lahaina	Maui	Historic house	website, operated by Lahaina Restoration Foundation, mid-19th century missionary home
Bernice P. Bishop Museum	Honolulu	Oahu	Multiple	Art, Hawaiian history and culture, Pacific cultures, science, Hawaii Maritime Center
Damien Museum	Honolulu	Oahu	Biographical	Life and works of Father Damien
East Hawaii Cultural Center	Hilo	Big Island	Art	In historic building that served as District Courthouse and Police Station
East-West Center Gallery	Honolulu	Oahu	Art	Performances and changing exhibits of traditional and contemporary arts of the Pacific region
Gallery ʻIolani	Kaneohe	Oahu	Art	website, part of Windward Community College
Greenwell Store	South Kona	Big Island	Living	Operated by the Kona Historical Society, site of Henry Nicholas Greenwell (1826–1891) store
Grove Farm	Lihuʻe	Kauaʻi	Historic house	1860s sugar plantation
Hale Paʻahao	Lahaina	Maui	Prison	website, operated by Lahaina Restoration Foundation, former Lahaina Prison
Hale Paʻi	Lahaina	Maui	Media	Operated by Lahaina Restoration Foundation, antique printing press equipment
Hana Cultural Center & Museum	Hana	Maui	Open air	website, includes local history museum, historic courthouse, jail, and four authentic Hawaiian hale (houses)
Hawaii Children's Discovery Center	Honolulu	Oahu	Children's	website
Hawaii Keiki Museum	Kailua-Kona	Big Island	Children's Science	website
Hawaii Nature Center	ʻĪao Valley	Maui	Natural history	website, facility in Maui features museum exhibits; also an education center in Makiki Valley in Honolulu
Hawaii Plantation Village	Waipahu	Oahu	Living	website, story of life on Hawaii's sugar plantations (c. 1900)
Hawaii Science and Technology Museum	Hilo	Big Island	Science	website, mobile science museum
Hawaii State Art Museum	Honolulu	Oahu	Art	Permanent and temporary exhibitions of Hawaiian art
Honolulu Museum of Art	Honolulu	Oahu	Art	Also includes Spalding House with contemporary art
Honolulu Police Department Law Enforcement Museum	Honolulu	Oahu	Law enforcement	website, evolution of law enforcement in Hawaii, operated by the Honolulu Police Department
Hoʻopulapula Haraguchi Rice Mill	Hanalei	Kauaʻi	Mill	website
Hui Noʻeau Visual Arts Center	Makawao	Maui	Art	website, includes fine art gallery
Huliheʻe Palace	Kailua-Kona	Big Island	Historic house	Former vacation home of Hawaiian royalty
ʻImiloa Astronomy Center	Hilo	Big Island	Astronomy	Hawaiian culture and history, astronomy (particularly at the Mauna Kea Observatories), and the overlap between the two
ʻIolani Palace	Honolulu	Oahu	Historic house	Royal palace of King David Kalākaua and Queen Liliʻuokalani
Isaacs Art Center	Waimea	Big Island	Art	Art museum of early and mid twentieth century Hawaii artists, also retail gallery, operated by the Hawaii Preparatory Academy
Jaggar Museum	Kilauea	Big Island	Science	Geological museum dedicated to seismology & volcanology, at Kīlauea in Hawaii Volcanoes National Park
Japanese Cultural Center of Hawaii	Honolulu	Oahu	Ethnic	website, history, heritage and culture of the Japanese American experience in Hawaii
John Young Museum of Art	Honolulu	Oahu	Art	Part of the University of Hawaii at Manoa, Asian and tribal art
Judiciary History Center	Honolulu	Oahu		Hawaii's legal history; located in Ali'iolani Hale
Kauaʻi Museum	Lihuʻe	Kauaʻi	Multiple	Includes art and artifacts of Native Hawaiians, local and natural history artifacts, and art exhibits
Koa Art Gallery	Honolulu	Oahu	Art	website, part of Kapiʻolani Community College
Kōkeʻe Museum at Kōkeʻe State Park	Kekaha	Kaua'i	Natural history	Natural and cultural history of Waimea Canyon State Park and Koke'e State Park
Kona Coffee Living History Farm	South Kona	Big Island	Living	Operated by the Kona Historical Society, depicts coffee pioneer's story with daily lives of early Japanese immigrants during the period of 1920–1945
Lahaina Heritage Museum	Lahaina	Maui	Local history	website, operated by Lahaina Restoration Foundation
Laupahoehoe Train Museum	Laupahoehoe	Big Island	Railroad	website
Lucoral Museum	Honolulu	Oahu	Natural history	website, corals, pearls, gemstones and fossils from around the world
Makawao History Museum	Makawao	Maui	Multiple	website, plantations, ranching, schools and churches, ethnic groups – the whole gamut of Makawao experience
Lyman House Memorial Museum	Hilo	Big Island	Natural history	Features Hawaiian culture, shells and minerals
Maui Arts & Cultural Center	Kahului	Maui	Art	website, includes fine art gallery
Mission Houses Museum	Honolulu	Oahu	Historic house	Three houses that interpret the "missionary period" of Hawaiian history, 1820–1863
Mokupāpapa Discovery Center	Hilo	Big Island	Natural history	Exhibits on the Northwestern Hawaiian Islands, now a National Monument, including fish and coral life
Nani Mau Gardens	Hilo	Big Island	Natural history	Botanical garden with museum about tropical plants and their role in Hawaiian culture
Onizuka Center for International Astronomy	Saddle Road	Big Island	Astronomy	On the slopes of Mauna Kea, stargazing programs, information about the telescopes and astronomical work done there
Pacific Aviation Museum Pearl Harbor	Ford Island, Hawaii	Oahu	Aviation	Located on Ford Island, includes historic aircraft, three historic hangars and an air traffic control tower
Pacific Tsunami Museum	Hilo	Big Island	Science	History of the April 1, 1946 Pacific tsunami and the May 23, 1960 Chilean tsunami which affected Hilo
Parker Ranch	Waimea	Big Island	Historic house	Working ranch with tours of two historic houses
Polynesian Cultural Center	Lā'ie	Oahu	Ethnic	Polynesian-themed living museum with displays of culture and craft, operated by the Church of Jesus Christ of Latter-day Saints
Puʻuhonua o Hōnaunau National Historical Park	Hōnaunau	Big Island	Archaeology	Park with complex of archeological sites and reconstructed temple and thatched structures
Puʻukohola Heiau National Historic Site	Kohala	Big Island	Archaeology	Temple ruins and exhibits
R. W. Meyer Sugar Mill Museum	Kalae	Molokai	Industry	information, information, also known as Molokai Museum and Cultural Center, historic sugar mill owned by Rudolph Wilhelm Meyer and museum
Queen Emma Summer Palace	Honolulu	Oahu	Historic house	Victorian retreat for Queen Emma of Hawaii
Queen's Medical Center Historical Room	Honolulu	Oahu	Medical	website, exhibits about the founding of the hospital and the early days of medicine in Hawaii
Shangri La	Honolulu	Oahu	Art	Historic Doris Duke mansion with Islamic art, furnishings and decorative art; tours by reservation only
Tropic Lightning Museum	Schofield Barracks	Oahu	Military	website, history of the 25th Infantry Division and Wheeler Army Airfield
University of Hawaii Art Gallery	Honolulu	Oahu	Art	website
U.S. Army Museum of Hawaii	Waikiki	Oahu	Military	Located at Fort DeRussy
USS Arizona Memorial	Pearl Harbor	Oahu	Military	Memorial and museum about the sunken USS Arizona
U.S.S. Bowfin Submarine Museum and Park	Pearl Harbor	Oahu	Maritime	World War II submarine and museum about submarines
USS Missouri	Pearl Harbor	Oahu	Maritime	Museum battleship
Waimea Sugar Mill Camp Museum	Waimea	Kauaʻi	Local history	information, history and culture of Hawaii's old sugar plantation communities and plantation tour
Waiʻoli Mission House	Hanalei	Kauaʻi	Historic house	1837 mission house
Washington Place	Honolulu	Oahu	Historic house	House where Queen Liliʻuokalani was arrested during the overthrow of the Hawaiian Kingdom, later Executive Mansion for twelve governors of Hawaiʻi
Whaler's Village Museum	Lahaina	Maui	Industry	website, whaling industry exhibits and whale information
Wo Hing Museum	Lahaina	Maui	Ethnic	Operated by Lahaina Restoration Foundation, Chinese cultural history in Maui

== Defunct museums ==
- Hawaiʻi Maritime Center, Honolulu, closed in 2009
- Hilo Art Museum, Kurtistown, Big Island
- Kamuela Museum, Kamuela, Hawaii
- Kauaʻi Children's Discovery Museum, Lihuʻe
- North Shore Surf and Cultural Museum, Waialua
- Pacific Aerospace Museum, Honolulu, located until 2000 at the Honolulu International Airport, displays now at the Pacific Aviation Museum Pearl Harbor
- Paper Airplane Museum, Kahului, Maui, information, closed since at least 2004
- The Contemporary Museum, Honolulu, merged into the Honolulu Academy of Arts in July 2011.

== See also ==
- Aquaria in Hawaii (category)
- Nature Centers in Hawaii

== Resources ==
- Hawai‘i Museums Association
- Hawaii Web – sites to see in Hawaii
