= Amy B. H. Greenwell Ethnobotanical Garden =

Botanical garden in Hawaii, United States

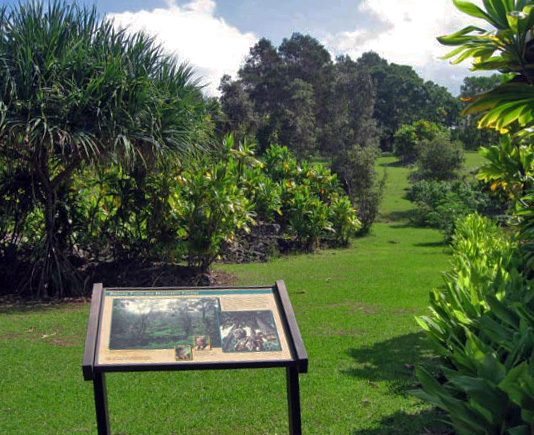
- Information sign at the garden
- Interactive map of Amy B. H. Greenwell; Ethnobotanical Garden
- Location: Island of Hawaiʻi
- Nearest city: Captain Cook, Hawaii
- Area: 15 acres (6.1 ha)
- Established: 1974
- Governing body: Bernice P. Bishop Museum
- Website: Official website

The Amy B. H. Greenwell Ethnobotanical Garden is a Hawaiian botanical garden near Captain Cook, Hawaii in the Kona District on the Big Island of Hawaii. Undergoing a change in management, the gardens were closed to the public from 2016–2019. The garden is now operated by Friends of the Garden and is open to the public Thursday through Sunday from 9 am to 2 pm, with free admission (accepting donations).

== Description ==
The 12-acre (4.9 ha) garden is owned by a community nonprofit called Friends of Amy B. H. Greenwell Ethnobotanical Garden. It is located at 19°29′29″N 155°54′43″W uphill (mauka) of the Hawaii Belt Road, known as Māmalahoa Highway or Hawaii Route 11, on the western slope of Mauna Loa.

Amy Beatrice Holdsworth Greenwell was born in 1920. Her father was Arthur Leonard Greenwell and mother was Beatrice Hunt Holdsworth. She was one of the 23 grandchildren of Henry Nicholas Greenwell, who arrived in Hawaii in the 1850s and became a successful merchant and rancher in the area. Her maternal grandparents were merchant Edmund William Holdsworth and Edith Mary Winifred Purvis, a distant cousin of William Herbert Purvis, a plant collector on the other side of the island.

Greenwell attended Stanford University where she became a member of Gamma Phi Beta and served as a nurse in World War II. After the war she worked with Otto Degener of the New York Botanical Garden on a book series titled Flora Hawaiiensis on Hawaiian plants. From 1953 to 1957 she served on a Historical Site Commission for the Territory. She performed archaeology studies of early habitation sites of Hawaii including Ka Lae (South Point), and wrote other books on tropical plants. Later in her lifetime she transformed her property by planting native and Polynesian-introduced plants in the extant Hawaiian agricultural areas. She left the garden to the Bishop Museum on her death in 1974 to be opened to the public. The museum closed the gardens to the public on January 31, 2016, and is trying to sell the land. The garden is slated to re-open on February 29, 2020.

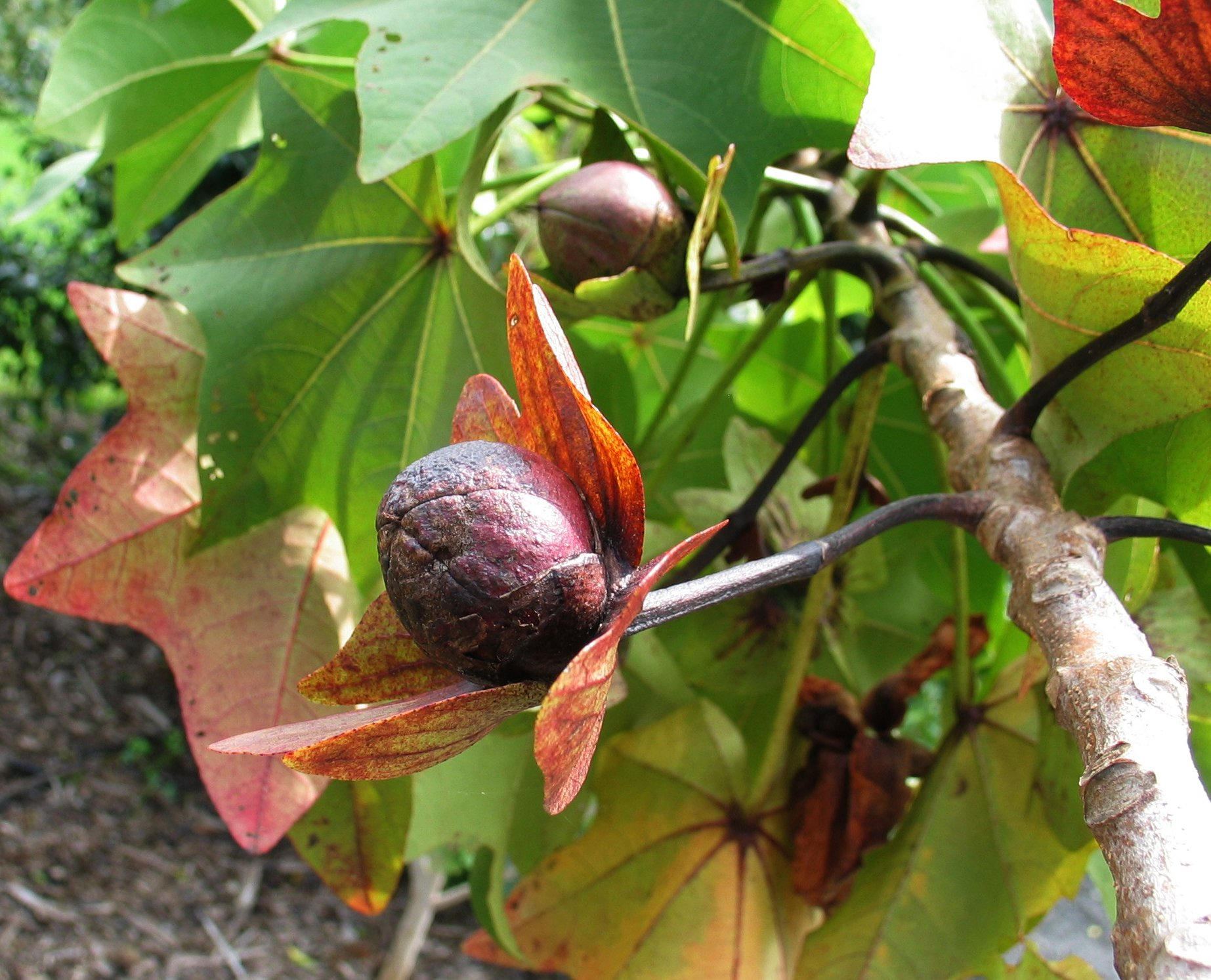
Cooke's kokia Malvaceae, endemic to the Hawaiian Islands (now extinct in the wild).

Today the garden contains over 200 species of endemic, indigenous, and Polynesian-introduced plants that grew in Kona before Captain James Cook's arrival. On Sundays the garden is open from 9 am until 2 pm and it is sometimes possible to take a guided tour during which the use and significance of the more important plants are explained. The garden's landscape includes four ecological zones: coastal, dry forest, agricultural, and upland forest. Its native insect house features the Kamehameha butterfly (Vanessa tameamea).

The garden sponsors a farmers' market known as the South Kona Green Market on Sundays. It was originally held at the adjacent County of Hawaii park named for Arthur Leonard Greenwell, but is now held a few hundred feet to the southeast at the Kealakekua Ranch Center, named for the former Arthur Leonard Greenwell family ranch which extended up the mountain, overlooking Kealakekua Bay. Across the highway the Kona Coffee Living History Farm run by the Kona Historical Society preserves a Kona coffee farm that was another part of the Greenwell landholdings.

In November 2019, the Friends of Amy B. H. Greenwell Ethnobotanical Garden announced their successful purchase of the land from the Bernice Pauahi Bishop Museum. The organization plans to perpetuate the cultural and educational legacy of the garden. The garden will re-open to the public on February 29, 2020.

== Family tree ==
Greenwell family tree

William Thomas Greenwell (1777–1856)	Dorothy Smales (1789–1871)
William Greenwell (1820–1918)	Dora Greenwell (1821–1882)	Francis Greenwell (1823–1894); Alan Greenwell (1824–1914)	Henry Nicholas Greenwell (1826–1891)	Elizabeth Caroline Hall (1841–1934)
William Henry Greenwell (1869–1927)	Maud Annandale Johnstone (1883–1976)	Arthur Leonard Greenwell (1871–1951)	Francis Radcliffe (Frank) Greenwell (1876–1966)	Seven others
Norman Leonard Greenwell (1926-1992)	Jean Greenwell (1929–2009)	Amy B. H. Greenwell (1920-1974)	Robert Francis Greenwell (1911–1992)	"Rally" Greenwell (1913–2006)
Thomas Frederick Greenwell (born 1958)	Robert Kelly Greenwell (born 1941)

== See also ==
- List of botanical gardens in the United States
