= William Herbert Purvis =

Plant collector and investor (1858–1950)

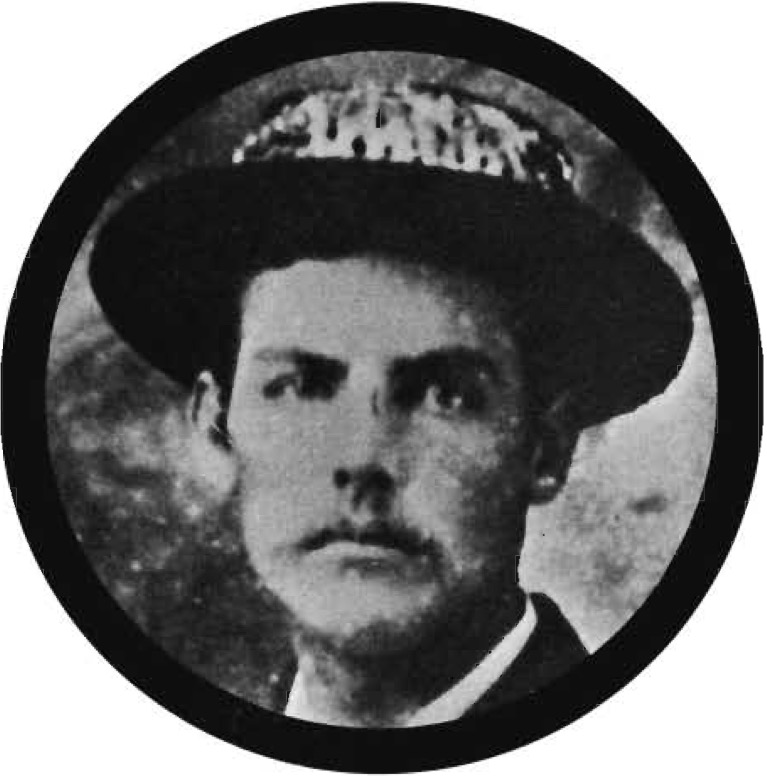
- Born: November 27, 1858; Sussex, England
- Died: December 31, 1950 (aged 92)
- Occupation: Planter
- Known for: Introduction of macadamia seeds to the Hawaiian Islands Introduction of the mongoose to the Hawaiian Islands

William Herbert Purvis (November 27, 1858 – December 31, 1950) was a plant collector and investor in a sugarcane plantation on the island of Hawaiʻi during the late nineteenth century.

William Herbert Purvis (also known as Herbert Purvis) was born in Sussex, England.

== Arrival in Hawaii ==
He and his father John Purvis (1820–1909) came to Hawaii in 1878. A distant cousin, Edith Mary Winifred Purvis, also came to Hawaii and married into the Holdsworth family; their daughter married into the Greenwell family (early Kona coffee merchants) and had daughter Amy B. H. Greenwell (1920–1974). Edith's brothers were Robert William Theodore, a businessman on Kauai, and Edward William Purvis who served as King Kalakaua's vice chamberlain.

== Involvement in plantations ==
The Purvis family were early investors in the Pacific Sugar Mill at Kukuihaele near Waipiʻo Valley on the northeast coast "Big Island" of Hawaiʻi. The lands were from the estate of King Lunalilo, consolidated by Purvis and the royal doctor Georges Phillipe Trousseau.

In 1882, Purvis introduced macadamia seeds into the Hawaiian Islands after he visited Australia. He planted seed nuts that year at Kapulena, Hawaii at 20°6′4″N 155°31′40″W, just southeast of the Pacific Mill. For many years, the trees were grown just as ornamental plants. Macadamias have since become an important tree crop in Hawaii. Total area in macadamia production is 20,200 acres (82 km^{2}) and Hawaii’s macadamia industry is valued at $175 million annually. Major macadamia production is on the island of Hawaii.

Purvis introduced the mongoose to control rats at the plantation in 1883. The mongoose has become an invasive pest. In 1889 he was elected into the Royal Colonial Institute.

In 1887, Purvis hired Scottish arboriculturalist David McHattie Forbes from his position as Foreman Forester of the estate of Fletcher's Saltoun Hall to import and cultivate cinchona trees above the sugar line in Kukuihaele, Hawaii at the Pacific Sugar Mill.

== Personal life and death ==
He married Mabel Vida Turner and had at least four children: Arthur Frederic Purvis (1890–1955), Inez Adele Isobel Kapuaimohala Purvis (1891–1961), John Ralph Purvis (1894–1915), and Herbert Charles Purvis (1897–1945).

After the death of his son, John Ralph Purvis, with the Rifle Brigade in 1915, Herbert used connections in the British Army to secure the same commission in the same unit John had fought with, despite being over 50 years old.

A year later at the battle of Bellewaerde Ridge, Herbert was leading his company through German trenches when he was hit through both legs by machine gun fire from a reserve trench. He was pulled towards friendly lines by two soldiers who were cut down. Herbert dragged himself towards British lines where he was rescued and taken to a triage station that saved his life.

Post convalescence, Herbert was reassigned to a training unit, though he continued to harass his superiors for transfers to the front.

After the war, he returned home safely. He died December 31, 1950.
