= Captain Cook, Hawaii =

Census-designated place in United States

- Census-designated place
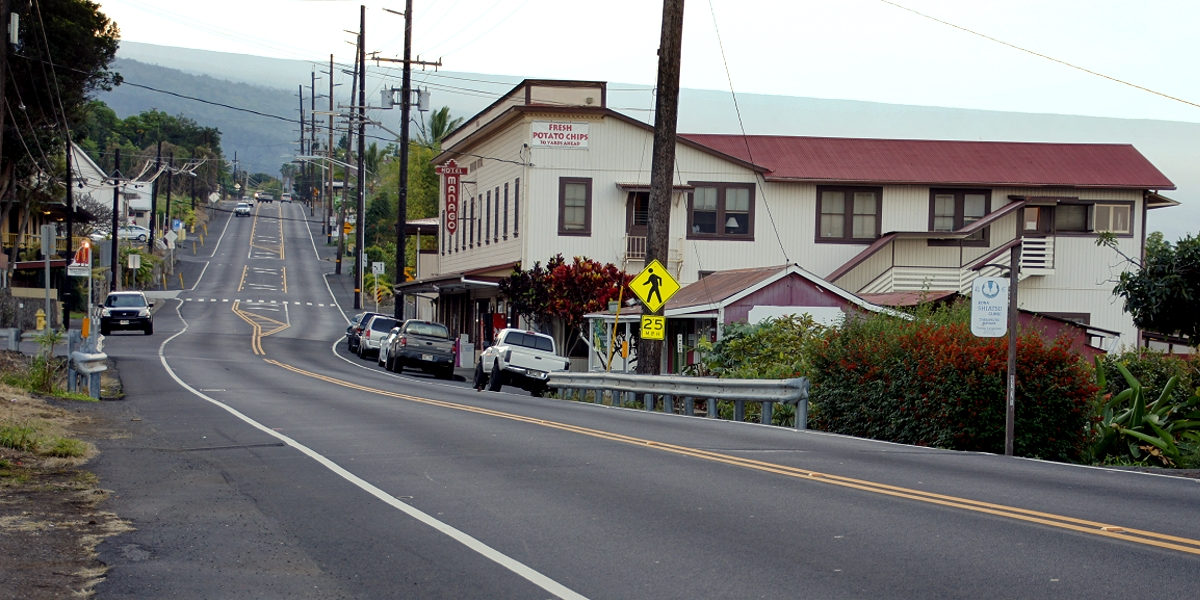

- Location in Hawaii County and the state of Hawaii

- Location in Hawaii
- Coordinates: 19°29′54″N 155°54′15″W
- Country: United States
- State: Hawaii
- County: Hawaii

Area
  - Total: 12.86 sq mi (33.30 km^{2})
  - Land: 12.86 sq mi (33.30 km^{2})
  - Water: 0 sq mi (0.00 km^{2})
- Elevation: 1,250 ft (381 m)

Population (2020)
  - Total: 3,253
  - Density: 253/sq mi (97.7/km^{2})
- Time zone: UTC−10 (Hawaii-Aleutian)
- ZIP Code: 96704
- Area code: 808
- FIPS code: 15-03850
- GNIS feature ID: 0358717

Captain Cook is a census-designated place (CDP) in Hawaiʻi County, Hawaiʻi, in the United States, located in the District of South Kona. The community, within the land division of Kealakekua, is so named because the post office for the area was located in the Captain Cook Coffee Co. during the early 1900s. As of the 2020 census, the CDP population was 3,253, down from 3,429 at the 2010 census. As of March 2022, a resolution was under consideration to rename the town to "Kaʻawaloa", meaning "long landing place".

== History ==
The area surrounding present‑day Captain Cook has been inhabited for centuries and includes several sites significant to Native Hawaiian history. In 1779, British explorer Captain James Cook made landfall at nearby Kealakekua Bay during his third Pacific voyage. Cook was killed there on February 14, 1779, following a conflict between his crew and local residents.

The modern community developed much later. In the early 20th century, the Captain Cook Coffee Company established a post office in the upland agricultural zone above the bay. Under postal naming conventions of the period, the post office name became the name of the surrounding settlement, and the community has been known as Captain Cook since that time.

== Geography ==
Captain Cook is located on the west side of the island of Hawaii at 19°29′54″N 155°54′15″W (19.498211, −155.904275). It is bordered to the north by Kealakekua and to the south by Honaunau-Napoopoo. Hawaii Route 11, part of the Hawaii Belt Road, passes through the community, leading north 12 miles (19 km) to Kailua-Kona and south 47 miles (76 km) to Naalehu. Hawaii Route 160 diverges from Route 11 in Captain Cook, leading south by a winding road 4 miles (6 km) to Napoopoo on Kealakekua Bay.

According to the United States Census Bureau, the Captain Cook CDP has a total area of 12.9 square miles (33.3 km^{2}), all of it land.

Most of Captain Cook lies between the 800-foot (240 m) and 2,000-foot (610 m) elevation, which makes it ideal as a coffee-growing region. It sits on the top of an ancient fault which created the famous Kealakekua Bay. Prior to the 1960s, most of Captain Cook was part of the vast Kealakekua Ranch, founded in the 1850s by English immigrant Henry Nicholas Greenwell.

== Demographics ==
Historical population
Census	Pop.	Note	%±
2020	3,253		—
U.S. Decennial Census

=== 2020 census ===
As of the 2020 census, Captain Cook had a population of 3,253. The median age was 45.6 years. 20.0% of residents were under the age of 18 and 27.1% of residents were 65 years of age or older. For every 100 females there were 88.0 males, and for every 100 females age 18 and over there were 85.7 males age 18 and over.

0.0% of residents lived in urban areas, while 100.0% lived in rural areas.

There were 1,116 households in Captain Cook, of which 28.6% had children under the age of 18 living in them. Of all households, 51.4% were married-couple households, 18.1% were households with a male householder and no spouse or partner present, and 22.8% were households with a female householder and no spouse or partner present. About 22.7% of all households were made up of individuals and 14.7% had someone living alone who was 65 years of age or older.

There were 1,290 housing units, of which 13.5% were vacant. The homeowner vacancy rate was 2.2% and the rental vacancy rate was 9.4%.

Racial composition as of the 2020 census
Race	Number	Percent
White	1,055	32.4%
Black or African American	20	0.6%
American Indian and Alaska Native	29	0.9%
Asian	885	27.2%
Native Hawaiian and Other Pacific Islander	275	8.5%
Some other race	116	3.6%
Two or more races	873	26.8%
Hispanic or Latino (of any race)	333	10.2%

=== 2010 census ===
As of the 2010 census, there were 3,429 people in 1,258 households residing in the CDP. The population density was 281.1 inhabitants per square mile (108.5/km^{2}). There were 1,386 housing units at an average density of 113.6 per square mile (43.9/km^{2}). The racial makeup of the CDP was 31.44% White, 0.67% African American, 0.38% American Indian & Alaska Native, 27.65% Asian, 10.67% Native Hawaiian & Pacific Islander, 2.16% from other races, and 27.03% from two or more races. Hispanic or Latino residents of any race were 9.51% of the population.

There were 1,258 households, out of which 22.0% had children under the age of 18 living with them. The average household size was 2.73.

In the Captain Cook CDP, 20.6% was under the age of 18, 7.0% from 18 to 24, 11.6% from 25 to 34, 15.4% from 35 to 49, 28.3% from 50 to 64, and 17.1% was 65 years of age or older. For every 100 females, there were 101.1 males. For every 100 males there were 98.9 females.

=== Income and poverty ===
For the period 2011-2015, the median estimated annual income for a household in the CDP was $66,276, and the median income for a family was $73,661. Male full-time workers had a median income of $35,833 versus $42,344 for females. The per capita income for the CDP was $38,885. About 10.2% of families and 8.8% of the population were below the poverty line, including 15.5% of those under age 18 and 5.5% of those age 65 or over.

== Lava zones, redlining, and insurance issues ==
Captain Cook shares much in common with the District of Puna. Both districts are situated on active volcanoes and contain large sections of land that are in Lava Flow Hazard Zone 2. Additionally, new lava hazard zones 11, 12, and 13 are being established to account for current flow activity to reduce redlining.

== Points of interest ==
- Amy B. H. Greenwell Ethnobotanical Garden
- Koa Coffee Plantation
- Kona Coffee Living History Farm
- Rodney J. T. Yano Memorial Hall

== Education ==
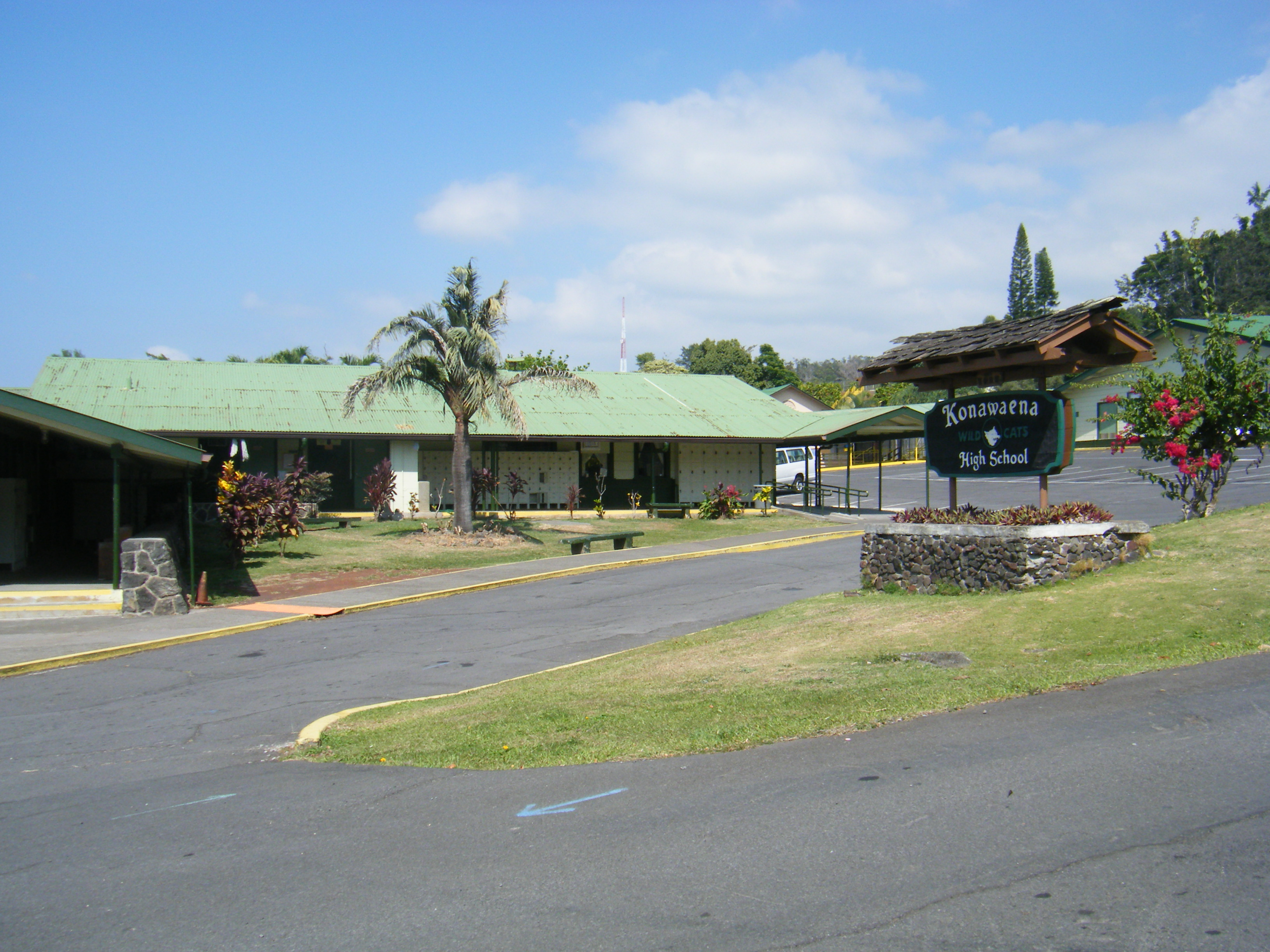
Konawaena High School

Hawaii Department of Education operates Konawaena Elementary School in the CDP.

Two schools, Konawaena Middle School and Konawaena High School, are on a campus partially in Captain Cook CDP and partially in Kealakekua CDP.
