= Kona Coffee Living History Farm =

Historic farm in Hawaii County, Hawaii, United States

- Uchida Coffee Farm
- U.S. National Register of Historic Places
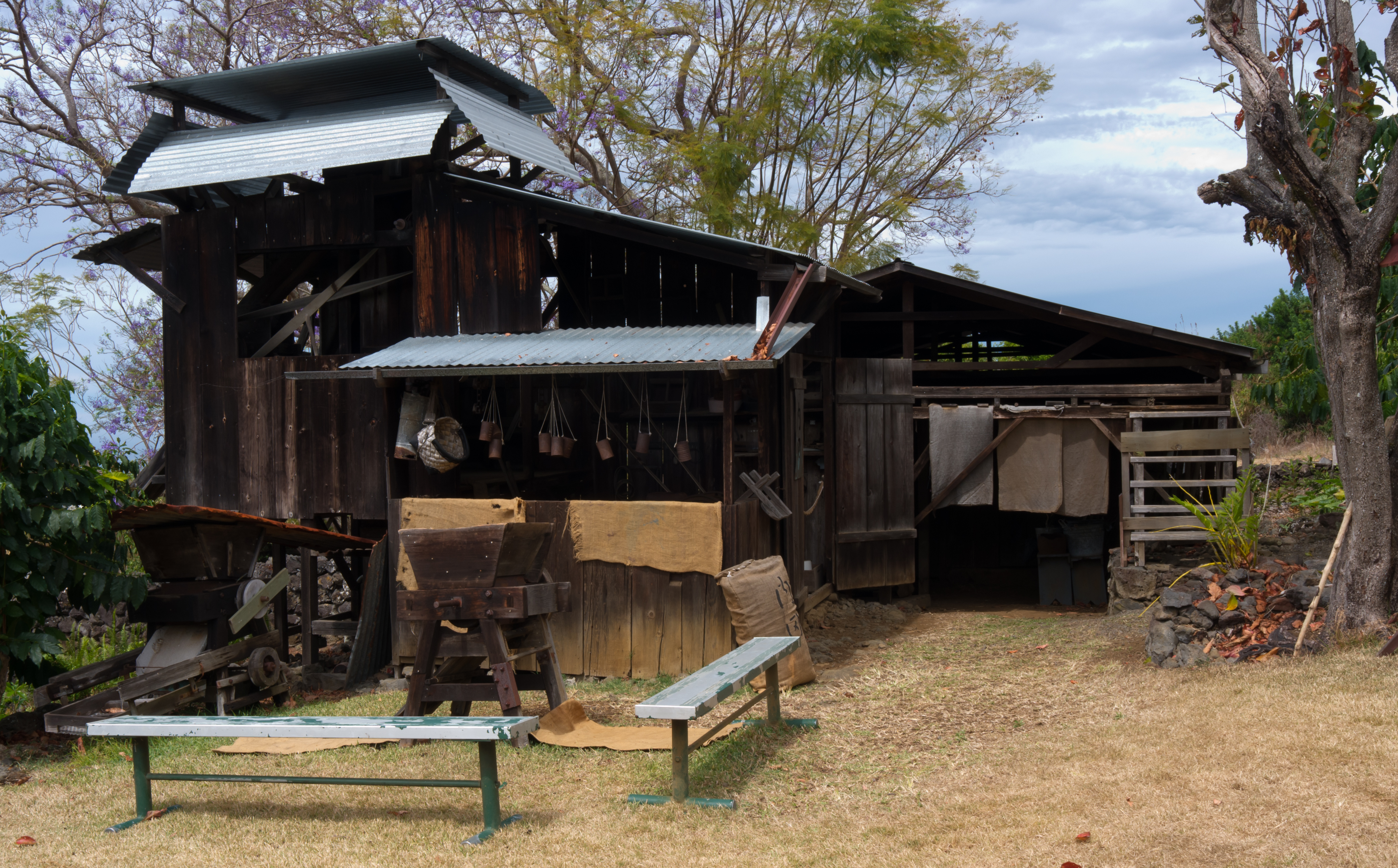
- Historic coffee mill

- Location within Hawaii
- Location: Kona District, Hawaii
- Coordinates: 19°29′24″N 155°54′49″W
- Area: 2 acres (0.81 ha)
- Built: 1913
- NRHP reference No.: 94001621
- Added to NRHP: February 9, 1995

Kona Coffee Living History Farm is located on the Daisaku Uchida Coffee Farm, in the Kona District, on the Big Island of Hawaiʻi. The 5.5-acre (22,000 m^{2}) historic Kona coffee farm was established in 1900.

The open-air agriculture museum depicts the daily lives of early Japanese immigrants to Hawaii during the period of 1920-1945. It is located at coordinates 19°29′24″N 155°54′49″W, the area now known as Captain Cook, and the traditional land division (ahupuaʻa) known as Kealakekua.

== History ==
The farm was owned by Daisaku Uchida, who came to Hawaii from southern Japan at the age of 19 on September 27, 1906. After a three-year sugar contract at Līhuʻe Plantation on Kauaʻi, Daisaku came to the Kona District.

Between 1868 and 1924, more than 140,000 Japanese workers came to Hawaii with labor contracts at sugarcane plantation. Many, like Uchida, decided to leave the plantations and start their own family businesses when their contracts expired.

In 1912, Daisaku married his cousin, Shima Maruo. They moved to the farm in 1913, expanding it and the house in 1925. The land was owned by the Greenwell family. Henry Nicholas Greenwell had been in the coffee trading business in the area since the 1870s.

The Uchida family lived here until Shima died at the age of 73 in 1966, and Daisaku in 1986 at the age of 99. Three children were born in the original house, and three in the new one after 1925. The eldest son Masao Uchida also farmed the property until he and his wife Masako retired to Honolulu in 1994.

=== Preservation ===
The long-term leasehold had finally run out, and the land was scheduled to be redeveloped into a residential subdivision. Since the farm had never been modernized, it was instead donated to the Kona Historical Society by Sherwood Greenwell.

== Museum ==
The living history museum offers self-guided tours, that include the coffee orchard, farmhouse, and coffee mill. A kiosk is open to visitors, and a full tour by costumed interpreters from the Kona Historical Society is available at limited times. A fee is charged.

The state registry of historic places listed the farm as site 10-47-7509 on April 16, 1994. On February 9, 1995 it was added to the National Register of Historic Places listings on the island of Hawaii as site number 94001621.

The original Henry Greenwell Store houses the Historical Society, and is also on the National Register. They are both located on the Mamalahoa Highway, known as the Hawaii Belt Road.

== See also ==
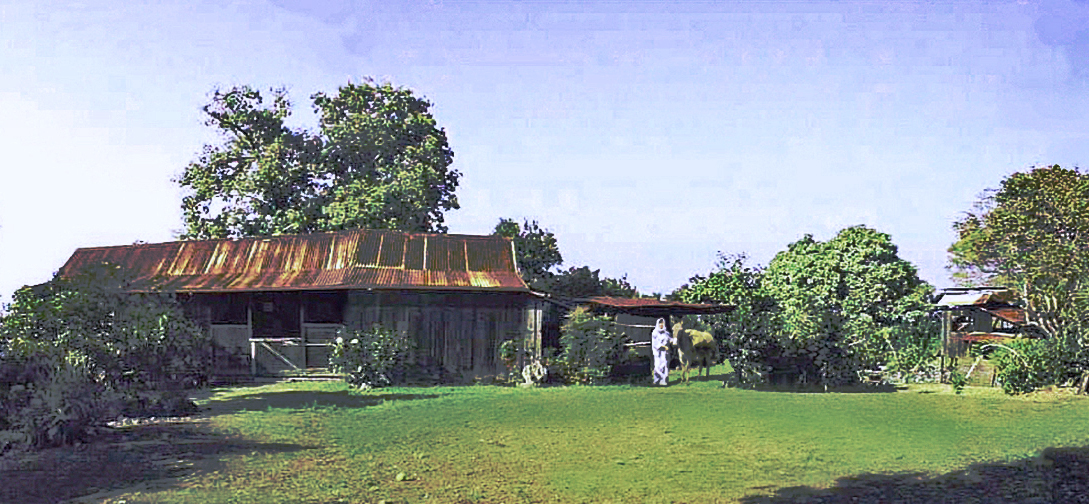
Uchida family farm house

- Coffee production in Hawaii
- Coffee processing
- Open-air museum
