= Judge Stanley =

Judge Stanley may refer to:

- Arthur Jehu Stanley Jr. (1901–2001), judge of the United States District Court for the District of Kansas
- Edwin Monroe Stanley (1909–1971), judge of the United States District Court for the Middle District of North Carolina
- William Stanley (Hawaii judge) (1872–1939), judge of the Republic of Hawaii
