= Kainaliu, Hawaii =

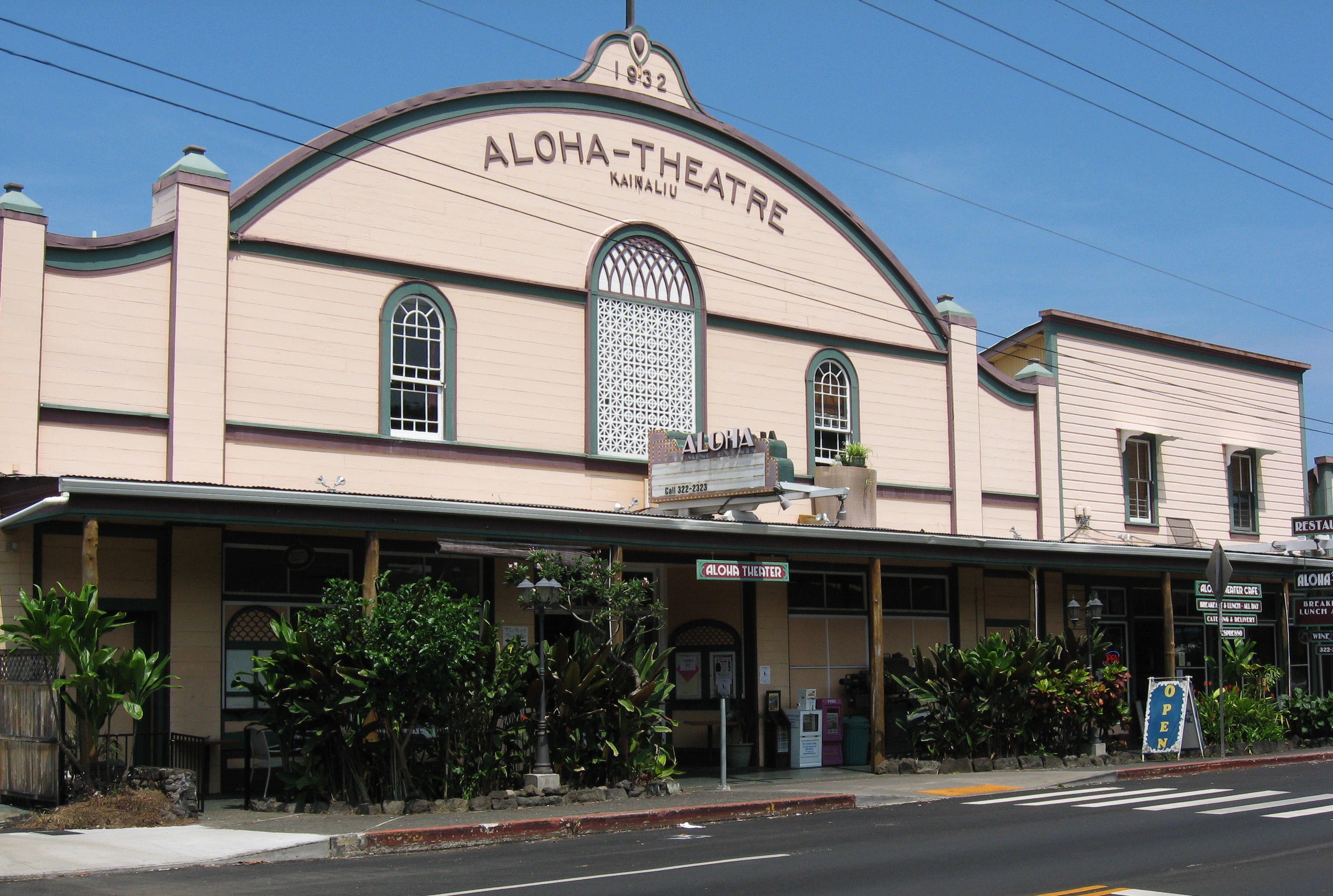
- Aloha Theater built in 1932
- Interactive map of Kainaliu, Hawaii
- Coordinates: 19°31′56″N 155°55′35″W
- Country: United States
- State: Hawaii
- County: Hawaii
- Elevation: 1,394 ft (425 m)
- Time zone: UTC-10 (Hawaii-Aleutian)
- ZIP code: 96750
- Area code: 808
- GNIS feature ID: 359919

Kainaliu is a small community in Hawaiʻi County, Hawaiʻi, United States.

== Geography ==
Kainaliu is located in the Kona district at coordinates19°31′56″N 155°55′35″W, along the Hawaii Belt Road, also called the Māmalahoa Highway or state route 11. For demographic information, see the census-designated places of Honalo, Hawaii to the north or Kealakekua, Hawaii to the south.

== History ==
The town was named for an ancient canoe bailer who worked for King Keawenuiaʻumi in the sixteenth century, from kā i nā liu in the Hawaiian language. It was also the site of an early coffee farm of Governor Kuakini.

The historic Lanakila Congregational church was built here in 1865−67. Its founder Rev. John Davis Paris (1809–1892) and his family are buried in the cemetery. The church was built on the land of William Johnson, who would marry the grandnephew of Isaac Davis, and have a daughter who married the son of Rev. Paris, and another who married wealthy businessman William Herbert Shipman.

In 1868, the self-proclaimed prophet Joseph Kaona convinced a band of followers the world would soon end. They tried to take over Lanikila church, then formed a communal camp on the beach. After the loss of two lives, they were captured and briefly imprisoned.

In 1932 the Tanimoto Theater opened here, showing both American and Japanese films for workers in the Kona coffee industry. It was designed by William Harold Lee, and seated 325. After World War II the name was to Aloha Theater. It was shut down in the 1970s, but restored and re-opened, playing mostly live events. It is the oldest theater in Kona that is still operating. The theater now houses a restaurant and since 2003 has been the home of the Aloha Performing Arts Company.

The Kona Research Station of the College of Tropical Agriculture and Human Resources of the University of Hawaii is located here. Although a trail originally led to a small settlement at the beach, the road was moved uphill to accommodate the growing traffic through the coffee-producing region. The two-lane road is now often congested, resulting in what locals call the "Kainaliu crawl". An attempt to open a bypass highway in 2000 was stalled by lawsuits, but a portion was opened in 2009. The legal challenge to the rest of the new highway had risen to the Supreme Court of Hawaii. The road was a condition of the Hōkūliʻa development of a golf course and vacation home development near the shoreline.
