= Molokai coffee =

Coffee grown on Moloka'i, Hawai'i

Moloka‘i coffee refers to a legally protected, geographical indication of coffee grown on the island of Molokai in Maui County, Hawai‘i, and processed to specific, legally defined standards. Similar to Kona coffee, Molokai coffee is a market name for a product of specific origin and of a defined quality. Requirements for Moloka‘i coffee not only dictate the origin and quality, but also label design and placement on product package.

Hawaii is one of the few U.S. states where coffee production is a significant economic industry; coffee is the second largest crop produced there. The 2019–2020 coffee harvest in Hawai‘i was valued at $102.91million.

== History ==
In 1984 the company Coffees of Hawaii, Inc. was formed and land-lease contracts were formed with Moloka‘i Ranch to establish a coffee farm in the Moloka‘i region. Four years later, 600 acres were planted with coffee and by 1993 the first commercial harvest was produced.

== Legal definition ==
To be legally labeled "Moloka‘i coffee," the coffee must be grown in the geographical region of Moloka‘i and meet the minimum requirements to be classified as "Moloka‘i prime" green coffee. The requirements to be labeled "Moloka‘i Prime" green include specific quality requirements. For example:

[Molokai] Prime green coffee consists of Hawaii beans which are clean; which do not impart sour, fermented, moldy, medicinal, or other undesirable aromas and flavors when brewed; which do not exceed twelve per cent or which does not contain less than nine per cent moisture by weight; and which do not exceed twenty per cent defective beans, by weight, included therein not more than five per cent, by weight, sour, stinker, black, or moldy beans that equal full imperfections only, as described in subsections (i)(1) and (i)(2); which may be assigned a size classification as stated in subsection (j)(1);

— Haw. Code R. § 4-143-6

== Producers ==
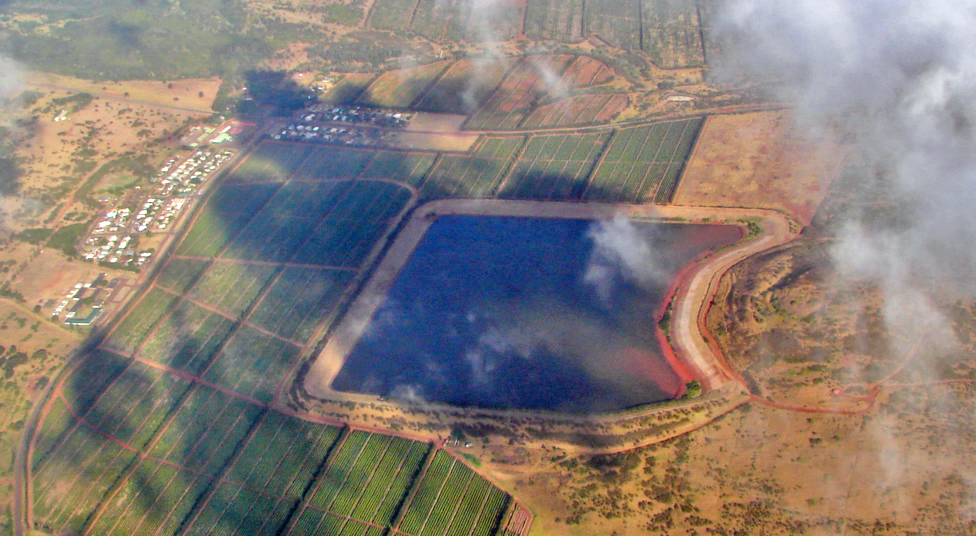
A Moloka‘i Coffee plantation in Moloka‘i, as seen from the air

German merchant Rudolph Wilhelm Meyer (1826–1897) grew coffee on the island and also built a sugar mill. "Coffees of Hawaii" is currently the only producer of Moloka‘i coffee. They are located on a 500-acre (2.0 km^{2}) plantation in Kualapu'u.

== Distributors ==
Trader Joe's introduced this coffee in mid-2008. The packaging, a 13-ounce (370 g) can, featured two red hummingbirds on a light yellow background filled with flowers. The can was titled "Moloka'i 100% One Hundred Percent Hawaiian Coffee" and "Dark Roast, Robust & Earthy, 100% Arabica Whole Bean Coffee".

== See also ==
- List of coffee beverages
- Coffee production in Hawaii
- Kona coffee
