= Trousseau =

Trousseau, a French term for "small bundle", may refer to:

- A dowry
- The wardrobe and belongings of a bride, including the wedding dress or similar clothing
- A hope chest, glory box or its contents
- Trousseau (grape), a wine grape also known as Bastardo
  - Trousseau Gris, a white mutation of the Trousseau grape
- Armand Trousseau (1801–67), French internist
- Georges Phillipe Trousseau (1833–1894), French physician and royal doctor of Hawaii
- Trousseau syndrome, a migratory thrombophlebitis associated with carcinomas of the lung and pancreas
- Trousseau sign of latent tetany, a sign of hypocalcemia

== See also ==
- Truso, an ancient town in East Prussia
