= Koa Coffee Plantation =

Former coffee grower and processor of Kona coffee

Koa Coffee Plantation is a former grower and processor of Kona coffee on Hawaiʻi island, United States, acquired by Paradise Beverages DBA Hawaii Coffee Company in 2009. Koa Coffee Plantation is roasted in Honolulu by Hawaii Coffee Company. Koa Coffee Plantation's place of business is 1560 Hart Street, Honolulu, HI.

The company was established on the western slopes of Mauna Loa in Captain Cook, Hawaii by Marin Artukovich in 1997, at 19°29′33″N 155°53′32″W. It began as a small backyard business only producing 38,000 pounds (17,000 kg) of coffee in its first year. Coffee production nearly doubled every year to reach 2010 production of over 700,000 pounds (320,000 kg).

In 2007, Artukovich sold most of the assets of the company to Kona's Best Natural Coffee. KBNC does business as Koa Coffee Plantation. Since 2009 Koa Coffee Plantation has been owned by Hawaii Coffee Company in Honolulu.

The Koa Coffee Plantation gained accolades in the late 1990s early 2000s when it had been producing and selling only hand picked 100% estate Kona coffee, including organic Kona coffee and a heritage blend (Grande Domaine Kona) harvested from trees dating back to 1918. The plantation used a wet mill facility from Colombia, a dry mill from Brazil and maintained temperature and humidity control in their former green bean storage facility in Captain Cook, Hawaii.

Koa Plantation was named by Forbes as America's best coffee in 2001, won the Pacific Coast Coffee Association Coffee of the Year Award in 2004 and Gevalia Cup in 2002. The Koa Coffee Plantation is also a member of the Specialty Coffee Association of America, the Kona Coffee Council and the Hawaii Coffee Association.
