= Coffee production in Hawaii =

Hawaii is one of the few U.S. states where coffee production is a significant economic industry – coffee is the second largest crop produced there. The 2019–2020 coffee harvest in Hawaii was valued at $102.9 million. As of the 2019–2020 harvest, coffee production accounted for 6,900 acres of land in Hawaii.

The coffee industry in Hawaii is well supported by organizations such as the Hawaii Coffee Association, the Hawaii Agriculture Resource Center and the College of Tropical Agriculture and Human Resources, University of Hawaii at Manoa and the state's Department of Agriculture.

== History ==
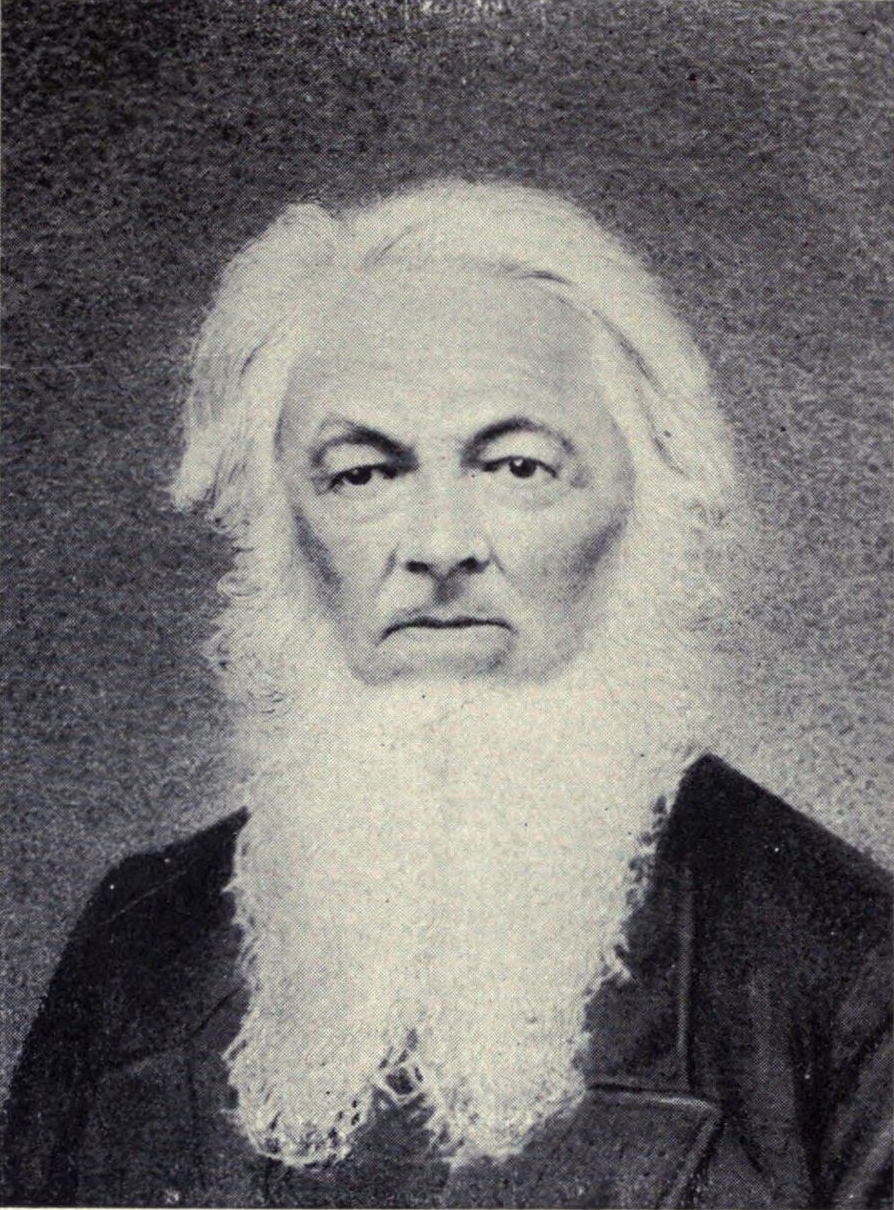
Samuel Ruggles brought coffee to the Kona District in 1828

Don Francisco de Paula y Marin recorded in his journal dated January 21, 1813, that he had planted coffee seedlings on the island of Oʻahu, but not much is known of the fate of that planting. John Wilkinson, a gardener who came on HMS Blonde in 1825 under Captain Lord Byron, brought coffee plants from Brazil. Governor Boki provided some land in the Mānoa Valley on Oʻahu. However, Wilkinson died in March 1827, and the trees did not thrive. Some cuttings were taken to other areas around Honolulu. Some plants from Manila were also grown by Richard Charlton, the British Consul.

More trees were set out in the Kalihi and Niu valleys near Honolulu, in 1828 or 1829. On the island of Hawaii Rev. Joseph Goodrich tried planting some coffee to make the Hilo mission self-sustaining. Goodrich planted gardens over his 12 years at Hilo, and taught classes for native Hawaiians on cultivation of both for cash to support the mission, as well as vegetables and tropical fruits for their own meals.

Rev. Samuel Ruggles (1795–1871) carried some cuttings of coffee to the Kona District when he was transferred from Hilo on the eastern side of the island of Hawaii to the Kealakekua Church on the western side in July 1828. Although it would take time to get established, this area would be the most successful.

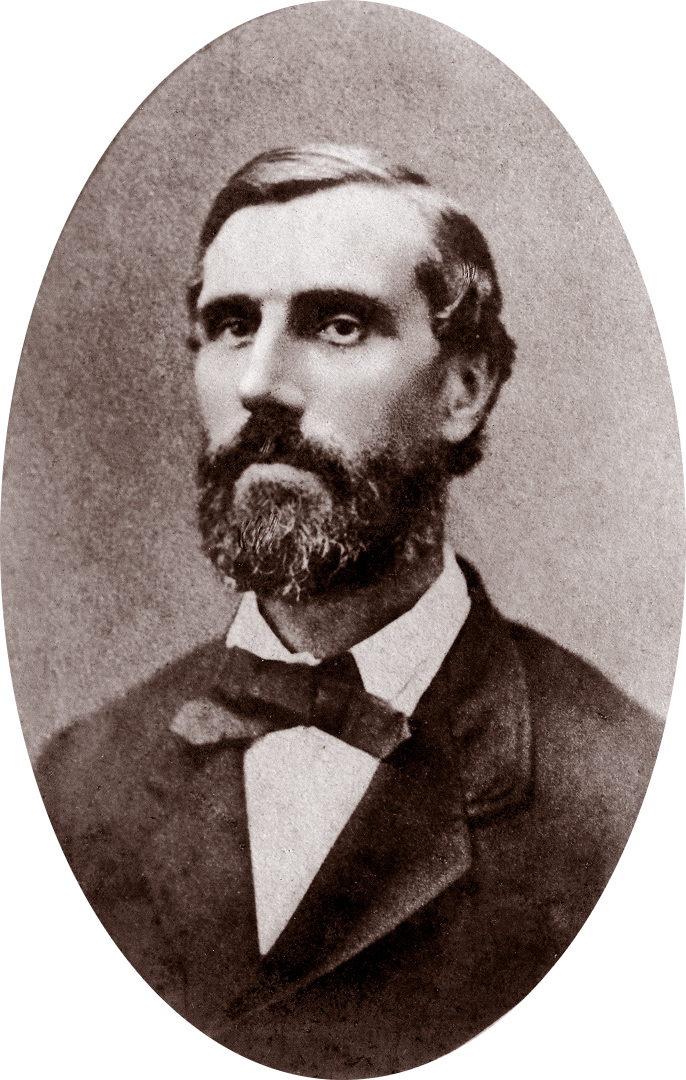
Pioneer coffee merchant Henry Nicholas Greenwell (1826–1891)

Early commercial ventures on the island of Kauaʻi in 1836 and 1845 ended in failure. The first records of production were made in 1845, of only 248 pounds, grown on Kauaʻi and Hawaii island. The great Mahele in 1848 allowed private ownership of land for the first time. Large areas were once grown on Maui, but were replaced by sugarcane and other crops. In particular, Scale insects infected many of the coffee trees on the other islands. The slopes in the Kona area were unsuitable for sugarcane, so the area became the center for the coffee industry in Hawaii. To be called Kona coffee, it must be grown in this district only.

In 1873, the world's fair in Vienna awarded Kona trader Henry Nicholas Greenwell an award for excellence, which gave some recognition to the "Kona" name. Around 1880 John Gaspar, Sr. (Married to Maria Rice Santos), built the first coffee mill in Hawaii near Kealakekua Bay. In 1892 the Guatemalan variety was introduced to Hawaii by German planter Hermann A. Widemann. Also about this time lady bugs (also called ladybird beetles) were able to control the scale infestation.

When the United States annexed Hawaii in 1898 (forming the territory of Hawaii), the dropping of tariffs meant sugar was even more profitable, and some coffee trees were torn up. Prices dropped in 1899 and 1900, which wiped out some remaining plantations. In 1916, production was about 2.7 million pounds, while sugar continued to expand. World War I in 1917 and a severe frost in Brazil in 1918 caused a world shortage, and prices rose.

Japanese laborers from sugarcane plantations would often start small farms in Kona after their employment contracts expired. By 1922 most coffee production in Hawaii had disappeared except in the Kona district. In 1932, Kona had over 1000 coffee farms; over 90% of these were managed by Japanese Hawaiians. The Great Depression of the 1930s depressed prices, and caused many farmers to default on their debts. After World War II, and another frost in South America, prices rose again in the 1950s. Production peaked in 1957 at over 18 million pounds.

By the 1970s, the tourism industry competed for labor, and production declined. The closing of the sugar and pineapple plantations in the 1990s provided a slow resurgence in the coffee industry.

== Modern production ==
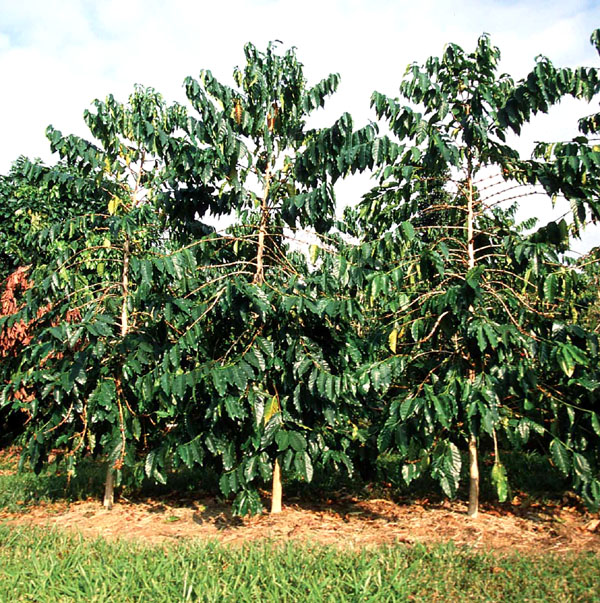
Coffee trees in Hawaii

The "coffee belt" in Kona is approximately two miles wide and ranging from 700 feet (210 m) to 2,000 feet (610 m) elevation. Other districts on the island where coffee is grown include Kaʻū in the far south, Puna in the southeast, and Hāmākua in the northeast.

Although coffee can be harvested year-round in Hawaii, the highest production runs from August to December. In the 2008–2009 season, there were about 790 farms on the island of Hawaii with another 40 on other islands. Average yield was equivalent to 1400 pounds of parchment per acre. A total of about 7,800 acres (3,200 ha) are planted with coffee throughout the state. A little over half the acreage is outside the island of Hawaii, in particular on the island of Kauai, indicating that farms on other islands are larger in average size compared to those on Hawaii. Although total production increased from 2007 to about 8.6 million pounds, farm prices actually dropped, so the dollar value decreased by about 8%. (Due to the relatively few coffee farms on Kauai, the numbers of Maui and Honolulu are combined in USDA statistics to avoid disclosure of individual operations in those counties.) Several former sugarcane and pineapple plantations have shifted to coffee production, such as Molokaʻi coffee.

Coffee berry borer (Hypothenemus hampei), the most harmful beetle to the arabica coffee crop, was discovered in Kona coast plantations in 2010. By 2020, the borer had been found on Oahu, Maui, Kauai and Lānaʻi. Borer crop damage has resulted in significant decreases in production per acre between 2010 and 2018, and the cost of spraying crops multiple times a year has decreased profit. Coffee leaf rust also has been found and threatened 2021 production.

== See also ==
- List of countries by coffee production
- Hawaiian Agriculture Research Center
