= Kualapuʻu, Hawaii =

Kualapuʻu
- Census-designated place
- Location in Maui County and the state of Hawaii
- Coordinates: 21°9′50″N 157°3′10″W
- Country: United States
- State: Hawaii
- County: Maui

Area
  - Total: 29.43 sq mi (76.23 km^{2})
  - Land: 29.30 sq mi (75.88 km^{2})
  - Water: 0.14 sq mi (0.35 km^{2})
- Elevation: 843 ft (257 m)

Population (2020)
  - Total: 2,110
  - Density: 72.0/sq mi (27.81/km^{2})
- Time zone: UTC−10 (Hawaii–Aleutian)
- ZIP code: 96757
- Area code: 808
- FIPS code: 15-39500
- GNIS feature ID: 0361457

Kualapuʻu is a census-designated place (CDP) on the island of Molokai in Maui County, Hawaiʻi, United States. The population was 2,110 at the 2020 census. Kualapuʻu can be literally translated as "hill overturned", but is thought to be a corruption of Puʻuʻuala: "sweet potato hill". The present settlement is a former pineapple cannery village once associated with Del Monte.

== Geography ==
Kualapuʻu is located at 21°9′50″N 157°3′10″W.

According to the United States Census Bureau, the CDP has a total area of 29.5 square miles (76.4 km^{2}), of which 29.3 square miles (76.0 km^{2}) is land and 0.2 square miles (0.4 km^{2}), or 0.46%, is water.

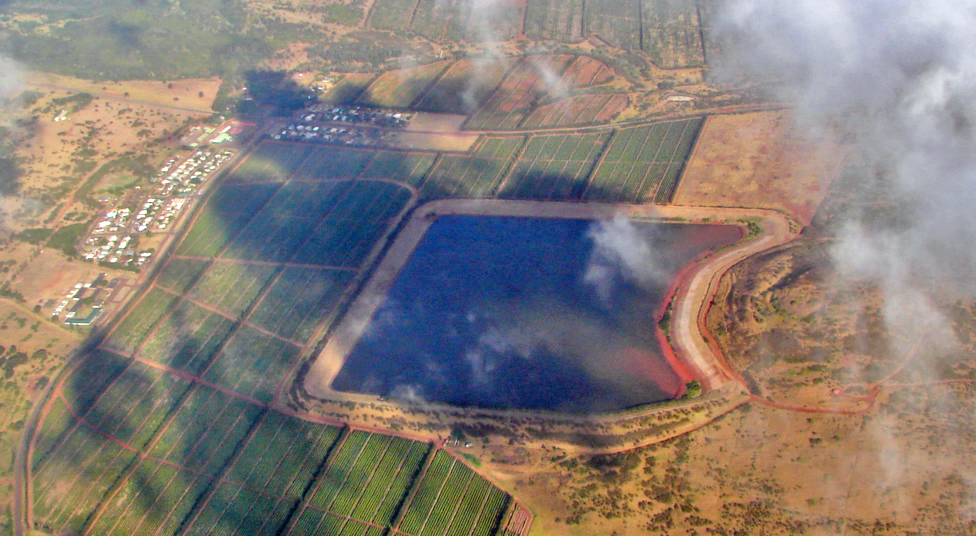
The village of Kualapuʻu, a coffee plantation owned and operated by "Coffees of Hawaii" that produces Molokai coffee, and the 1.4-billion-US-gallon (5,300,000 m^{3}) reservoir at the foot of the cinder cone Kualapuʻu, for which the area is named

== Demographics ==
Historical population
Census	Pop.	Note	%±
2000	1,936		—
2010	2,027		4.7%
2020	2,110		4.1%
U.S. Decennial Census

As of the census of 2000, there were 1,936 people, 564 households, and 465 families residing in the CDP. The population density was 63.5 inhabitants per square mile (24.5/km^{2}). There were 592 housing units at an average density of 19.4 per square mile (7.5/km^{2}). The racial makeup of the CDP was 7.7% White, 0.5% Native American, 16.7% Asian, 43.5% Pacific Islander, 0.4% from other races, and 31.2% from two or more races. Hispanic or Latino of any race were 4.8% of the population.

There were 564 households, out of which 35.5% had children under the age of 18 living with them, 59.9% were married couples living together, 14.0% had a female householder with no husband present, and 17.4% were non-families. 14.5% of all households were made up of individuals, and 4.4% had someone living alone who was 65 years of age or older. The average household size was 3.43 and the average family size was 3.78.

In the CDP the population was spread out, with 33.5% under the age of 18, 7.1% from 18 to 24, 25.1% from 25 to 44, 21.4% from 45 to 64, and 12.9% who were 65 years of age or older. The median age was 34 years. For every 100 females there were 101.0 males. For every 100 females age 18 and over, there were 99.8 males.

The median income for a household in the CDP was $37,422, and the median income for a family was $37,895. Males had a median income of $30,833 versus $21,595 for females. The per capita income for the CDP was $15,373. About 11.2% of families and 15.1% of the population were below the poverty line, including 19.9% of those under age 18 and 12.3% of those age 65 or over.
