= Greenwell Store =

Historic store in Hawaii County, Hawaii

- U.S. National Register of Historic Places
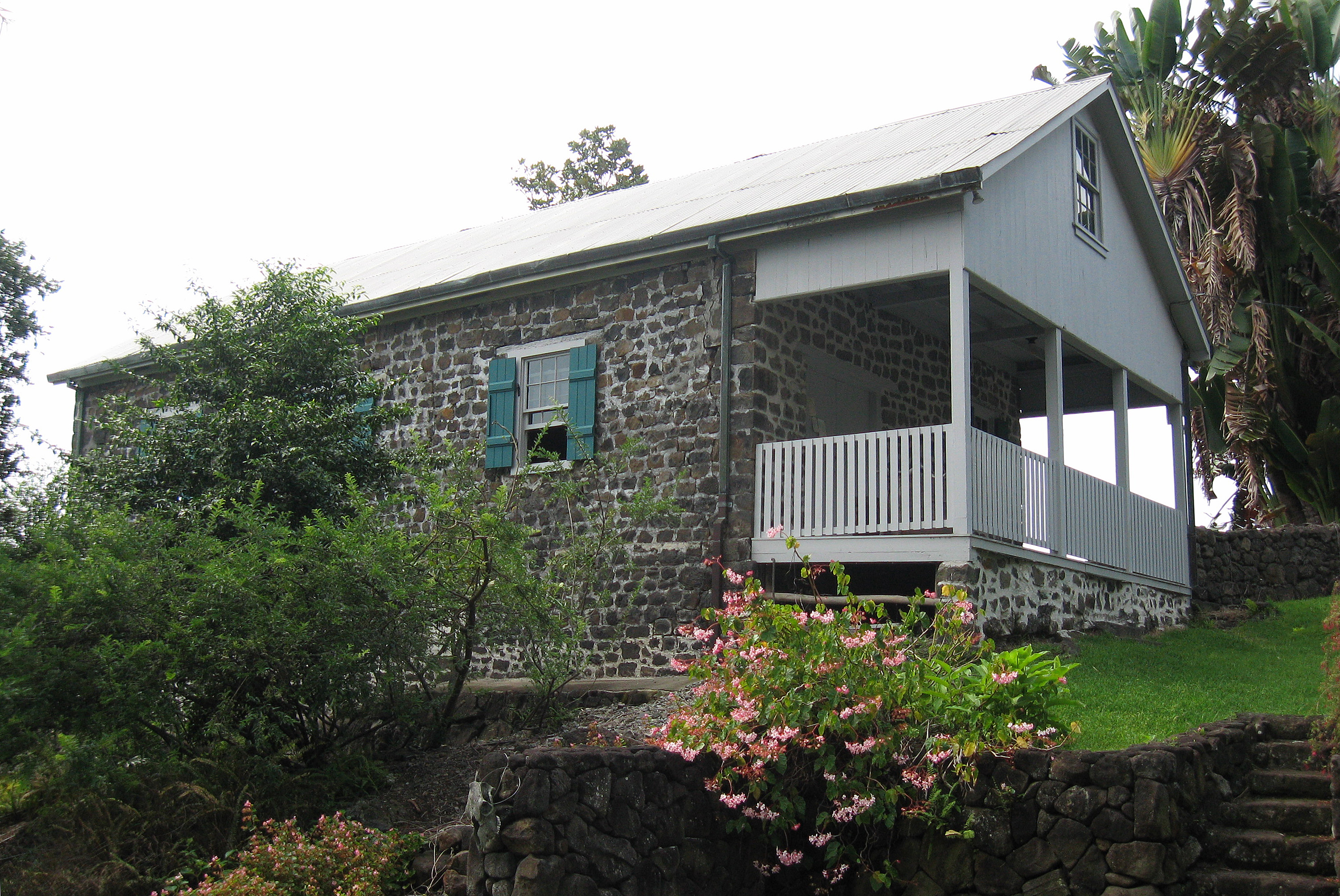
- Built circa 1870

- Location within Hawaii
- Location: Hawaii Belt Road, Kealakekua, Hawaii
- Coordinates: 19°30′37″N 155°55′12″W
- Area: 1 acre (0.40 ha)
- Built: 1870; 156 years ago
- NRHP reference No.: 78001017
- Added to NRHP: May 22, 1978

The Greenwell Store is a historic building now run as a museum by the Kona Historical Society.

== History ==
Henry Nicholas Greenwell (1826–1891) was an English merchant who originally came to Hawaii in 1850. He went back to England in 1867, and returned and married Elizabeth Caroline Hall (1841–1934). They lived in a wooden house, (the foundation is still visible) and had a stone house built that was used as a store since 1870. The building is a simple rectangle about 25 feet (7.6 m) by 55 feet (17 m) with a basement, main floor, and attic. Walls are 24 inches (61 cm) thick, made of stones with mortar.

Since Greenwell served as Postmaster, the town that grew up around the store was known as Kealakekua, Hawaii, even though the actual traditional land division of that name is further south. The Hawaii Belt Road now runs past the store.

Descendant Norman Leonard Greenwell (1926–1992) and his wife Jean Greenwell (1929–2009) were founders of the Kona Historical society in 1976. On May 22, 1978, the store was added to the National Register of Historic Places listings on the island of Hawaii as site 78001017. The society restored the former store to its appearance circa 1875, and opened it as a museum. The store was added as site 10-37-7243 to the state of Hawaii registry of historic places on August 17, 1991. Another nearby Greenwell property, the Kona Coffee Living History Farm, is also open for tours by the society.

== Greenwell family tree ==
Greenwell family tree

William Thomas Greenwell (1777–1856)	Dorothy Smales (1789–1871)
William Greenwell (1820–1918)	Dora Greenwell (1821–1882)	Francis Greenwell (1823–1894); Alan Greenwell (1824–1914)	Henry Nicholas Greenwell (1826–1891)	Elizabeth Caroline Hall (1841–1934)
William Henry Greenwell (1869–1927)	Maud Annandale Johnstone (1883–1976)	Arthur Leonard Greenwell (1871–1951)	Francis Radcliffe (Frank) Greenwell (1876–1966)	Seven others
Norman Leonard Greenwell (1926-1992)	Jean Greenwell (1929–2009)	Amy B. H. Greenwell (1920-1974)	Robert Francis Greenwell (1911–1992)	"Rally" Greenwell (1913–2006)
Thomas Frederick Greenwell (born 1958)	Robert Kelly Greenwell (born 1941)
