= Georges Phillipe Trousseau =

French physician (1833–1894)

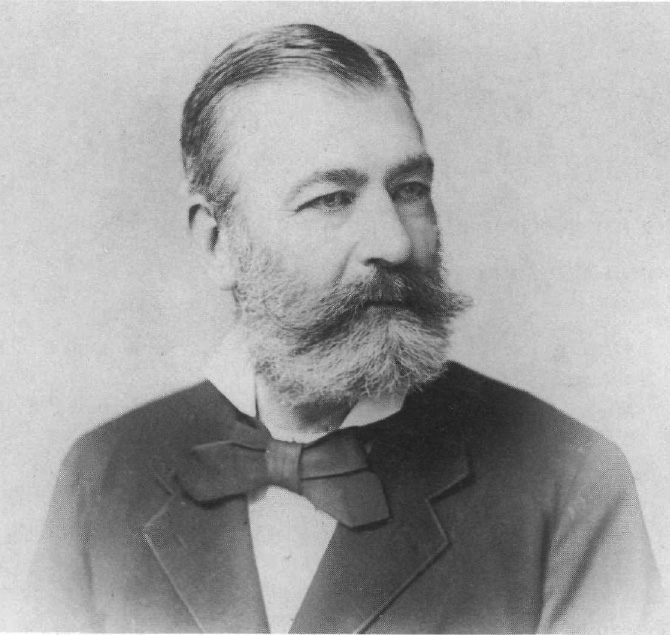
- Born: 1 May 1833; Paris, France
- Died: 4 May 1894 (aged 61); Honolulu, Hawaii, U.S.
- Occupation: Physician
- Parent: Armand Trousseau

Georges Phillipe Trousseau (1 May 1833 – 4 May 1894) was a French physician who became the royal doctor of the Kingdom of Hawaii, and engaged in a variety of agricultural ventures.

== Biography ==
Georges Phillipe Trousseau was born in Paris on 1 May 1833. His father was pioneering internist Armand Trousseau (1801–1867). He claimed to have served in the army during the French Revolution of 1848 known as the "June days". He taught Georges Philippe biology, he said: "I gave him Spallanzani, and every day he reads and analyzes a chapter." He also taught him botany.

In 1854 he married Geneviève Edma Vaunois. Their sons were ophthalmologist Armand Henri Trousseau (1856–1910) and Rene Adolphe Trousseau (1857–?). He and his wife legally separated by 1865.

He followed his father's profession and became a physician in 1858.

=== Hawaiian practice ===
After his father's death in 1867, Trousseau sailed to Australia. At some time he went to New Zealand, and then to the Hawaiian Islands in May 1872. There he became known with the slightly less French-sounding name George P. Trousseau. Perhaps coincidentally, his father's colleague Philippe Ricord had a nephew who took the name John Ricord when he came to Hawaii in the 1840s. President of the board of health and Minister of the Interior Ferdinand W. Hutchinson consulted Trousseau when Kamehameha V became ill, but the king died that December. His successor, King Lunalilo, was elected by the legislature. Since Lunalilo was also a patient of Trousseau, his influence grew.

On 4 February 1873 Trousseau was appointed port physician of Honolulu, and to the Hawaii board of health. He also served on Lunalilo's military staff with the rank of Colonel. On 18 March 1873 he officially became a citizen of the Kingdom of Hawaii. One of his first public health issues was a smallpox epidemic. Trousseau was a firm believer in the germ theory of disease, and used this knowledge to limit the death toll of the outbreak, compared to previous waves that had devastated the native Hawaiian population. His other major influence was on the leprosy policy. Convinced that leprosy was contagious, Trousseau advocated the enforcement of a strict segregation policy.

In November 1873, as Lunalilo's health was failing, Trousseau traveled with the royal court to Kailua-Kona and stayed in the Hulihee Palace. By January 1874, Trousseau thought the king had a short time to live, so he advised Lunalilo to return to Honolulu and deal with naming a successor. Lunalilo's death on 3 February 1874 without naming an heir caused another political crisis. The legislature did not elect the popular Queen Emma of Hawaii, but instead King Kalākaua. Kalākaua was also a patient of Trousseau, and some reports tell of Kalākaua hiding in Trousseau's house during the protests following his election.

=== Sheep and sugar ===
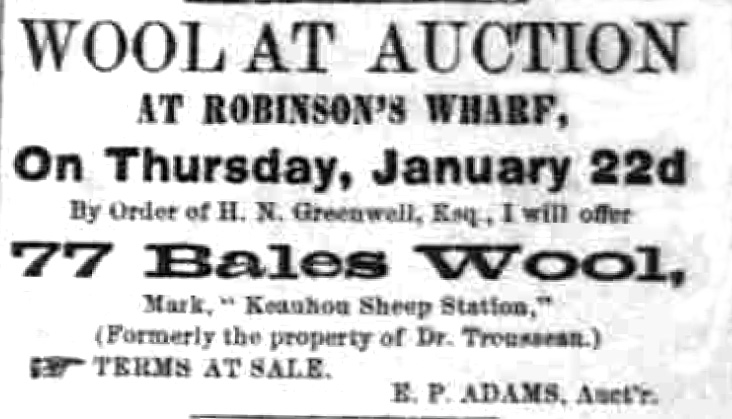
Advertisement for wool, usually not associated with tropical islands

In 1875 Trousseau bought a large tract of land in present-day Honalo on the island of Hawaiʻi, and moved there in 1877. His plan was to raise sheep on high pasture land. A road still named for him is still visible at 19°32′40″N 155°55′43″W, which once ran about 9 miles (14 km) from the Puʻulehua ranch at 4,900 feet (1,500 m) elevation on the slopes of Mauna Loa to the beach. He also entered into a relationship with a Hawaiian woman Makanoe, who was already married.

In 1879 he sold the ranch and 11000 sheep to English merchant Henry Nicholas Greenwell and started a new venture, investing in the Pacific Sugar Mill in Kukuihaele. Records show him being manager in 1879, but after about three years he sold his shares to William H. Purvis and moved back to Honolulu.

Around this time, his wife back in Paris started legal action to recover some debts of Trousseau's that she had settled.

=== Medicine and ostriches ===
He re-opened his medical practice in May 1882. When Father Damien was visiting Honolulu from Kalawao in the leper colony at Kalaupapa on the island of Molokaʻi early in 1885, Trousseau diagnosed that the future saint had contracted the disease. In 1885 he attended Queen Emma when she died.

He became president of the board of health in 1887, after Walter M. Gibson was accused of embezzlement.

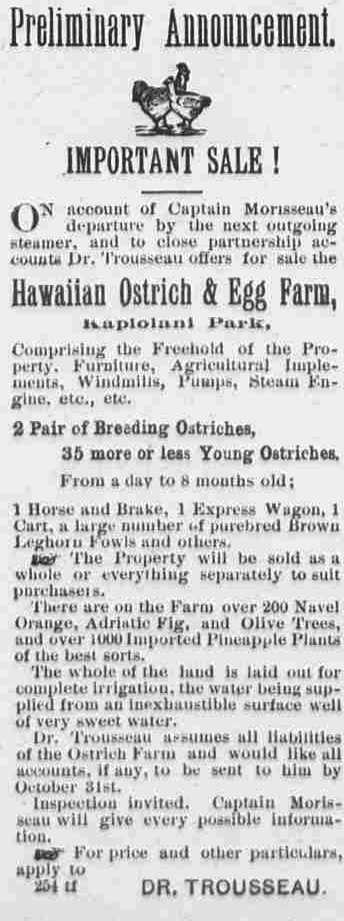
An advertisement in the Daily Bulletin newspaper about the sale of the ostrich farm.

By 1890 he started a third venture. He purchased about 1,000 acres (400 ha) from the Lunalilo estate in Kaimuki just north of Diamond Head, and started raising ostriches. The plan was to sell feathers to European hat makers. The birds could be viewed by visitors to Kapiolani Park.

His nephew Jean Morisseau, the son of Achille Morisseau and his only sister Madame Morriseau, managed the ranch, until his sister's death in early 1894. The farm was later sold to Paul Isenberg.

=== Later years and death ===
After the overthrow of the Kingdom of Hawaii, he was attacked for being a royalist because of his associations with kings and queens. However, he pointed out that and his father fought for making and keeping France a republic. In the Blount Report, Trousseau accused the descendants of American missions of conspiring with John L. Stevens in the overthrow.

When Robert Louis Stevenson became ill while visiting Honolulu in 1893, the Scottish author consulted Trousseau. Stevenson composed a poem "The Pirates' Island" on the suggestion of Trousseau while recovering.

J. Marion Sims, a colleague of his father, attacked Trousseau in his autobiography:

He was a gambler and every thing else that was bad. His father was worried to death with his dissoluteness and foolish extravagance, and had to pay enormous sums of money to extricate him from his disgraceful orgies and gambling complications.

Trousseau admitted he left Paris penniless after losing his money on speculations, but said Sims sensationalized the story.

In July 1893 he resigned from the board of health, protesting that the strict segregation policy (which he had supported about 20 years earlier) was no longer scientifically necessary.

Trousseau died on 4 May 1894 and was buried in Makiki Cemetery by his mistress Makanoe. Alexander Cartwright was executor of his will, although he died first and the new executor was Alexander's son Bruce Cartwright. His properties were left to Makanoe. This resulting in several lawsuits by his widow, who was still owed money from the earlier settlement. Trousseau had mortgages and other debts which had to be paid off. Lawyers hired by his widow included Alfred S. Hartwell and William F. L. Stanley.

A street is named for him in the part of Honolulu that used to be the ostrich farm, at 21°16′16″N 157°48′28″W. In the 1999 film Molokai: The Story of Father Damien, Trousseau was played by Michael W. Perry.
