= William Stanley (Hawaii judge) =

American judge

William Frederick L. Stanley
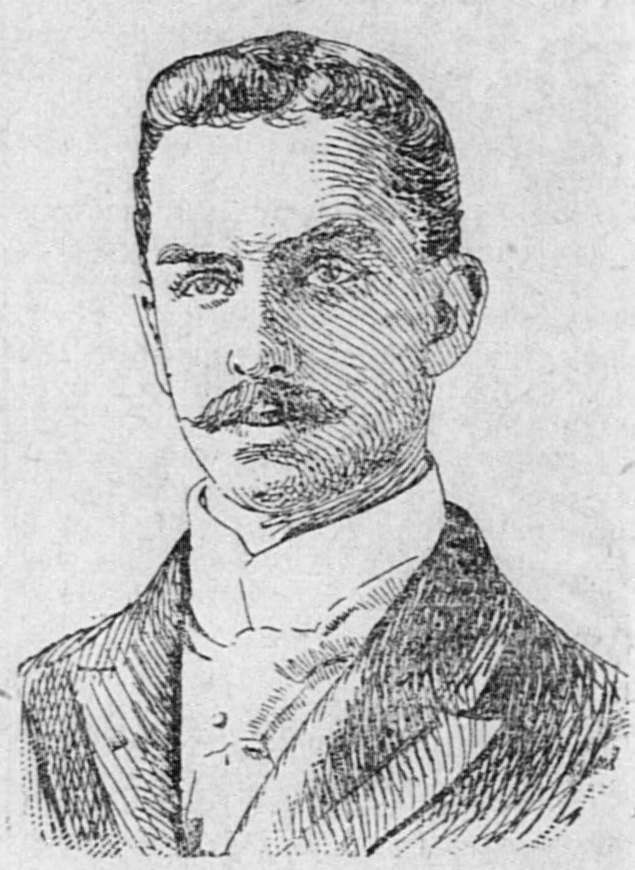
- Newspaper sketch 1897
- Born: March 1872; Dublin, Ireland
- Died: June 1939 (aged 67); Honolulu
- Occupations: Lawyer, Judge

William Frederick L. Stanley (1872–1939) was an Irish lawyer who served as judge of the Republic of Hawaii.

== Life ==
Stanley was born in Dublin, Ireland in March 1872. His father was James Charles Stanley and mother was Catherine Lucas. After common school education in Dover, England and Dublin, he studied at Trinity College, Dublin 1889–1893. Before graduating, he came with Sir Robert Herron to the Hawaiian Islands. In May 1895 he started as a clerk in the office of Alfred S. Hartwell, and was admitted to the bar in March 1895. Stanley married Juanita Danford October 20, 1896. Their children were Charles Desmond Stanley, Eileen Stanley, Dermot Stanley, Brian Henry Stanley.

In November 1895 Stanley became a partner with Hartwell and Lorrin Andrews Thurston. One major case was the window of French physician Georges Phillipe Trousseau (1833–1894). On November 1, 1897 he was appointed to be the youngest circuit court judge at the time, after Alfred Wellington Carter resigned. For a few weeks in 1898 he also filled in on the 4th circuit. He served as judge on the 1st circuit until July 30, 1900.

He had fallen out of favor with the Republican Party of Hawaii because he was not a United States citizen, but as judge presided when others were naturalized. He finally became naturalized himself in August 1900. Active in Freemasonry, he was the Master of Pacific Lodge #822 and a member of the Aloha Shriners.

Back in private practice, he became partner with Henry Holmes until 1915, with Wilder until 1916, by himself until 1920, and then with William Owen Smith and Warren. His law firm survives as Case Lombardi & Pettit. He served on some commissions of the Territory of Hawaii, including the board of public instruction from 1910 to 1913.

He died in June 1939.
