= Kona coffee =

Market name for Hawaiian coffee brand

Kona coffee is the market name for coffee (Coffea arabica) cultivated on the slopes of Hualalai and Mauna Loa in the North and South Kona Districts of the Big Island of Hawaii. It is one of the most expensive coffees in the world. Only coffee from the Kona Districts can be described as "Kona." The weather of sunny mornings, clouds or rain in the afternoon, little wind, and mild nights combined with porous, mineral-rich volcanic soil create favorable coffee-growing conditions. The loanword for coffee in the Hawaiian language is kope, pronounced [ˈkope].

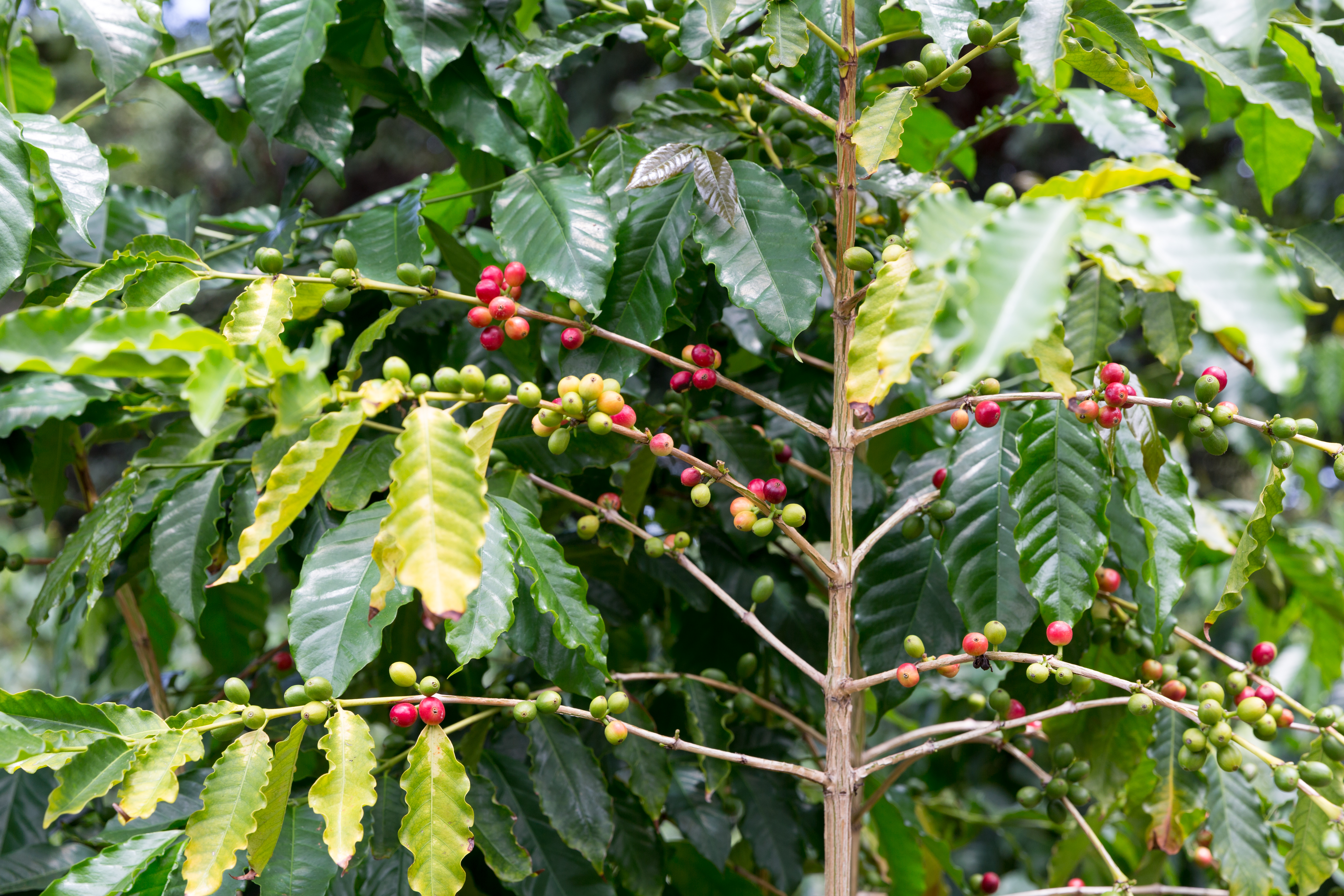
Kona coffee fruits

== History ==
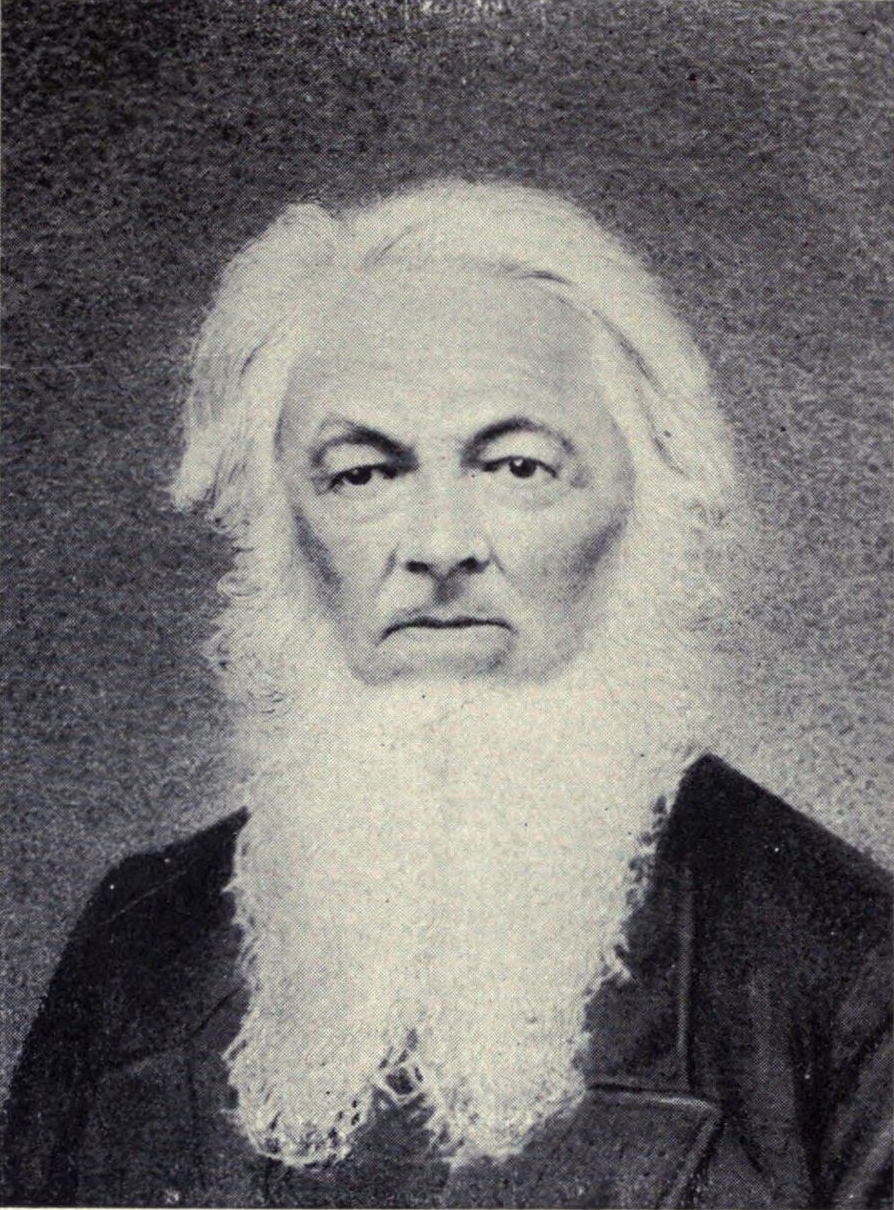
Samuel Ruggles brought coffee to the Kona District in 1828

The coffee plant was brought to the Kona district in 1828 by Reverend Samuel Ruggles from Brazilian cuttings. English merchant Henry Nicholas Greenwell moved to the area and established Kona Coffee as a recognized brand later in the 19th century. The former Greenwell Store and Kona Coffee Living History Farm have since become museums.

In other parts of the Hawaiian islands, it was grown on large plantations, but the 1899 world coffee market crash caused plantation owners to lease land to their workers. Most were from Japan, brought to work on sugarcane plantations. They worked their leased parcels of 5–12 acres (2–5 hectares) as family concerns, producing large, quality crops.

The tradition of family farms continued throughout Kona. The Japanese-origin families have been joined by Filipinos, mainland Americans, and Europeans. There are approximately 800 Kona coffee farms, with an average size of less than 5 acres (2 ha). In 1997, the total Kona coffee area was 2,290 acres (927 ha), and green coffee production was just over two million pounds.

== Kona Coffee Belt ==
The Kona Coffee Belt is a recognized terroir located on Hualalai Mountain and Mauna Loa, ranging from 500 to 3200 feet above sea level. It starts from Hawaii Route 190 on Palani Road, with Makalei being its most northern section, includes Koloko, goes through Hawaii Route 180, also called North Kona Road or Kona Heritage Corridor, passes through Holualoa, and merges with Hawaii Route 11 at Kainaliu and extends through Kealakekua and Hōnaunau.

The area is characterized by average rainfall (60+ inches per year average), slightly acidic, well-drained volcanic soil, mild temperature swings from day to night (85 degrees day, 60 degrees night average), sunny morning and cloudy afternoons, flowering in the dry season, fruiting during the wet season, and wind-protected western slopes.

== Growing and processing ==
Kona coffee blooms in February and March. Small white flowers known as "Kona snow" cover the tree. Green berries appear in April. By late August, red fruit, called "cherry" because it resembles a cherry, starts to ripen for picking. Each tree, hand-picked several times between August and January, provides around 15 pounds of cherry, which results in about two pounds of roasted coffee.

Within 24 hours of picking, the cherry is run through a pulper. The beans are separated from the pulp and placed overnight in a fermentation tank. The fermentation time is about 12 hours at low elevations or 24 at higher elevations. The beans are rinsed and spread to dry on a hoshidana or drying rack. Traditional hoshidanas have a rolling roof to cover the beans in the rain. It takes seven to 14 days to dry beans to an optimal moisture level of between 10 and 13% (by Hawaii Department of Agriculture regulations: 9.0–12.0%). Too much moisture in coffee allows the growth of ochratoxin A, a harmful mycotoxin hazardous to human health. From here, the beans are stored as "pergamino" or parchment. The parchment is milled off the green bean before roasting or wholesale.

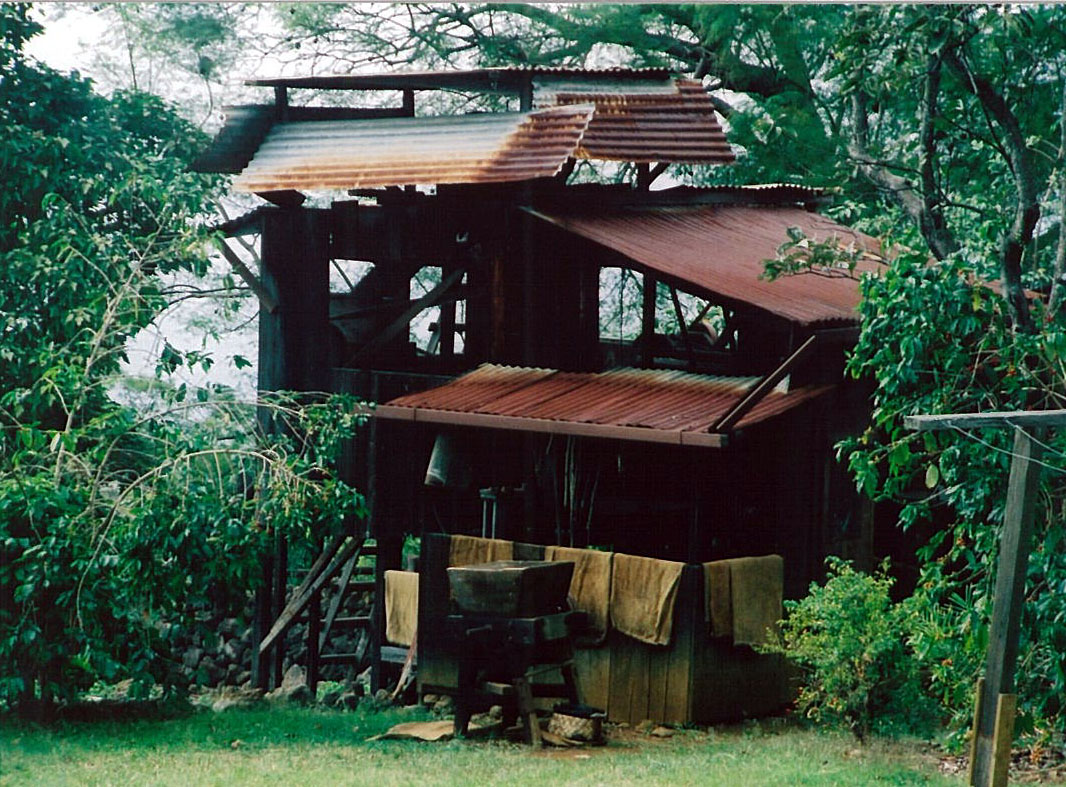
Old mill at the Kona Coffee Living History Farm

Kona coffee beans are classified by law according to seed. Type I beans consist of two beans per cherry, flat on one side, oval on the other. Type II beans consist of one round bean per cherry, otherwise known as peaberries. Further grading of these two types of beans depends on size, moisture content, and purity of bean type. Type I Kona coffee grades are "Kona Extra Fancy", "Kona Fancy", "Kona Number 1", "Kona Select", and "Kona Prime". Type II Kona coffee grades are "Peaberry Number 1" and "Peaberry Prime". Also, a lower grade of coffee, called "Number 3" (or "Triple X"), cannot legally be labeled as "Kona" but as "Hawaiian" coffee. Any bean grade below Number 3 is considered "Offgrade" coffee and can only be labeled generic. Not an official classification grade, but commonly used by Kona coffee farmers, is the "Estate" grade, which consists of various separate grades except for removing the "Number 3" and "Offgrade" beans.

Infestations of the root-knot nematode damaged many trees in the Kona districts in the 1990s. Symptoms are single or clusters of trees with stunted growth, especially when transplanted. In 2001, rootstock from the Coffea liberica species was found resistant to the nematodes. It could be grafted with the Coffea arabica "Guatemala" variety to produce a plant that naturally resists the pest, still producing a quality coffee product. The combination was named after Edward T. Fukunaga (1910–1984), who was superintendent of the University of Hawaii's Kona Research Station in Kainaliu in the 1950s through the 1970s.

== Kona blends ==
Because of the rarity and price of Kona coffee, some retailers sell "Kona Blends." These are not a combination of different Kona coffees but a blend of Kona and Colombian, Brazilian, or other foreign coffees. Usually, they contain only the minimum required 10% Kona coffee and 90% cheaper imported beans.

Current Hawaiian law requires blends to state only the percentage of Kona coffee on the label but not any other coffee origins. There is no matching Federal law. Some retailers use terms such as "Kona Roast" or "Kona Style". To be considered authentic Kona coffee (without the word "blend" on the label), the state of Hawaii's labeling laws require the prominent display of the words "100% Kona Coffee".

In 1993 the Kona Coffee Council, a regional coffee growers association, tried unsuccessfully to protect the name "Kona Coffee" by trademarking its logo with the United States Patent and Trademark Office. They were opposed by Kona Kai Farms, Inc, Captain Cook Coffee Co., Hawaiian Isles Enterprises, and Hawaii Coffee Company. In 2000 the Department of Agriculture of the State of Hawaii registered a "100% Kona Coffee" certification mark with the U.S. Patent and Trademark Office. Administration in regard to this certification mark was handed over by the State Department of Agriculture to the Hawaii Coffee Company, part of Topa Equities Ltd, based in Los Angeles.

Kona coffee farmers launched a class action lawsuit against some of the largest retailers in the United States on February 27, 2019. The Lanham Act permits a civil action for, among other reasons, "false designation of origin." Walmart, Costco, Amazon, Safeway, and Kroger were among the sellers and producers of 19 brands of coffee allegedly marketed as Kona coffee that were named in the complaint. Several companies agreed to a settlement in March 2021 totaling more than $13.1 million to benefit Kona coffee farmers.

== Recent developments ==
In the 1990s, Kona coffee growers sued a company called Kona Kai Farms, based in Berkeley, California. In October 1996, federal officials in San Francisco indicted Kona Kai Farms executive Michael Norton on wire fraud and money laundering charges. He was found to have put Central American coffee into bags with labels indicating it was Kona coffee since 1993. In 2000 Norton pleaded guilty to one count of wire fraud and one count of tax evasion.

Some Kona farms have become successful tourist attractions. Although some roadside stands are allowed with special permits, large gift shops in some areas that are zoned agricultural have met local resistance.

Former Mayor of Hawaii County Stephen Yamashiro, who served from 1992 to 2000, is credited with introducing the "100% Kona Coffee" logo and emblem now used by the industry.

=== Coffee berry borer infestation ===
Coffee berry borer (Hypothenemus hampei), the most harmful beetle to the arabica coffee crop, was discovered in Kona coast plantations in September 2010 by a graduate student of the University of Hawaii. How the tiny beetle got to Kona is unknown, but the size of the infestation indicates it has been going on for a few years. Some growers suspected severe drought conditions had reduced the fungus Beauveria bassiana, which might have kept the beetle population under control for years.

By late November 2010, the Hawaii Department of Agriculture declared a quarantine on all green (unroasted) beans leaving the island. Fumigation with a chemical such as methyl bromide or a six-step procedure was required. The price of Kona coffee was expected to rise because the insect has the potential to reduce crop yields up to 90%. In early 2011 the Hawaii State Dept. of Agriculture allowed the import and application of a concentrated naturally occurring fungus (Beauveria bassiana) to successfully combat the infestation.

As of 2021, coffee leaf rust also has been found and threatens production.

== See also ==
- List of coffee beverages
- Coffee production in Hawaii
- Jamaican Blue Mountain Coffee
- Kona Coffee Living History Farm
