= Henry Nicholas Greenwell =

American politician

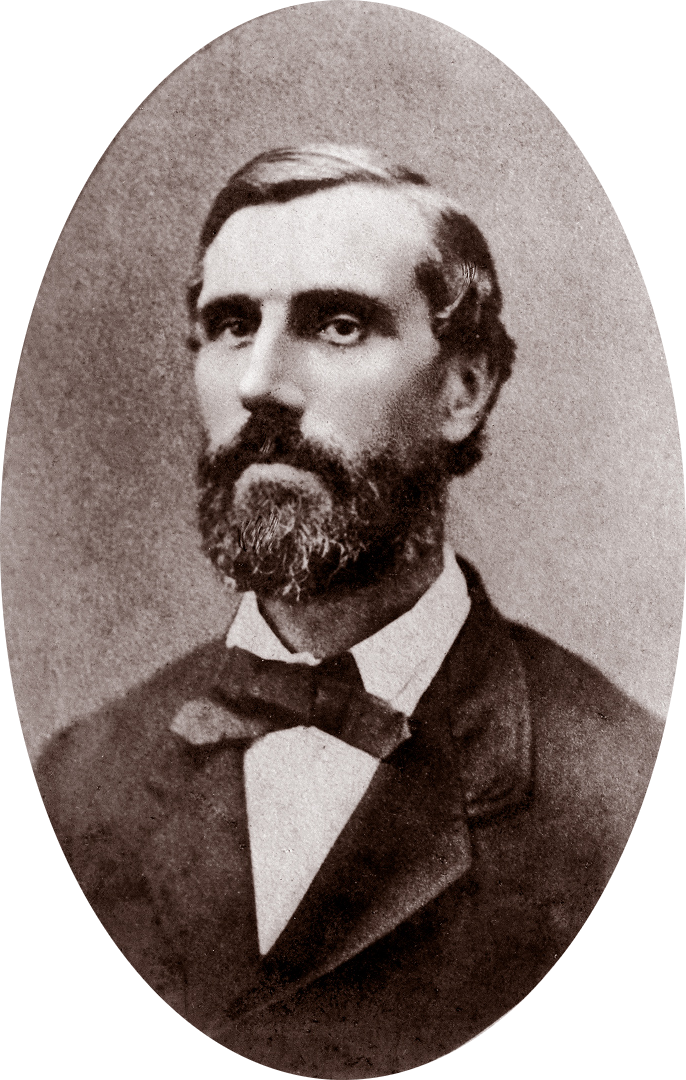
- Circa 1867
- Born: 9 January 1826; Lanchester, County Durham, England
- Died: 18 May 1891 (aged 65); Kealakekua, Hawaii
- Occupations: Merchant, Rancher
- Known for: Kona coffee
- Spouse: Elizabeth Caroline Hall
- Children: 10

Henry Nicholas Greenwell (9 January 1826 – 18 May 1891) was an English merchant credited with establishing Kona coffee as an internationally known brand. His family became major land-holders in the Kona District of the island of Hawaiʻi. The Greenwell Store is now a museum and historical center.

== Life ==
Henry Nicholas Greenwell was born 9 January 1826 in Lanchester, County Durham, England. His father was William Thomas Greenwell (1777–1856) and mother was Dorothy Smales (1789–1871). His oldest brother was William Greenwell (1820–1918) an English archaeologist who became canon at Durham Cathedral. His sister Dorothy (1821–1882) published poetry under the name Dora Greenwell. He had two other older brothers Francis Greenwell (1823–1894) and Alan Greenwell (1824–1914). As fourth son he had little chance of inheriting the family estate called Greenwell Ford. He attended Durham School and Royal Military Academy Sandhurst expecting a military career.

In 1844 Greenwell purchased a commission as a Lieutenant in the 70th Regiment of the British Army which was stationed in Ireland during the great Famine. He became disenchanted, sold his commission in 1847 and on 15 March 1848, left for Melbourne, Australia. Arriving in June 1848, he traveled to Sydney looking for a sheep or cattle station, but came instead to California in 1849 for the California Gold Rush. When the ship arrived in San Francisco, the crew immediately left and headed for the gold fields, leaving him with goods he intended to sell. After injuring himself unloading, he sailed to the Hawaiian Islands in January 1850 to recover. After a brief time in Honolulu working at the H. J. Holdsworth store, he moved to Kailua-Kona, and opened his own retail store in the Kona District in late 1850.

In late 1852 one of Greenwell's Chinese servants died after being accused of theft. He was arrested and charged with second degree murder. Asher B. Bates was prosecutor, William Little Lee judge, and a jury of British subjects was found for the trial in January 1853. Witnesses testified that Greenwell had beaten or whipped the man, but others said the man was already ill and that Greenwell treated his employees fairly. After half an hour the jury unanimously found him not guilty. The case formed a precedent still cited in the Hawaii state criminal code.

Greenwell became successful growing Oranges to send to the expanding California market. However, in 1866 the crop was destroyed by blight, so he looked to diversify. In 1867 on what would be a circumnavigation of the earth, he visited New Zealand and returned to England to visit family. On his return he picked up a new variety of Oranges in Brazil, and ideas for other potential crops. He also met his future wife on the voyage. Greenwell married Elizabeth Caroline Hall (1841–1934) 9 April 1868 and had six sons, four daughters, and 23 grandchildren. The new crop being grown in this area was coffea, the tree bearing the fruit made into "beans" for coffee. The first trees were brought to the Kona area by missionaries at nearby Kahikolu Church in the late 1820s. The few earlier attempts had uneven results, but the Greenwell brand developed a reputation for consistent quality for Kona coffee.

Greenwell served as Collector of Customs at the port at Kealakekua Bay, and as Postmaster and area School Superintendent. A stone building was built just south of the wooden house, in the traditional land division (ahupuaʻa) known as Kalukalu (for a type of grass that grows there). The oranges continued to be mentioned by travelers through the area.

Isabella Bird, who knew Dora in England, visited the Greenwells in 1873. Greenwell's coffee was honored at the 1873 World's Fair in Vienna. In 1876 Greenwell provided coffee as part of the Centennial Exposition in Philadelphia, Pennsylvania. The Greenwell family traded in sheep skins and dairy products, eventually using the profits to buy more land in the area. Coffee only grows in a narrow elevation band, so drier areas above the usual cloud cover were used as pasture land for cattle, sheep, and horses. Early in 1879, the royal physician Georges Phillipe Trousseau sold all of his holdings in Kona to Greenwell. Other lands were purchased from the family of missionary John Davis Paris.

== Legacy ==
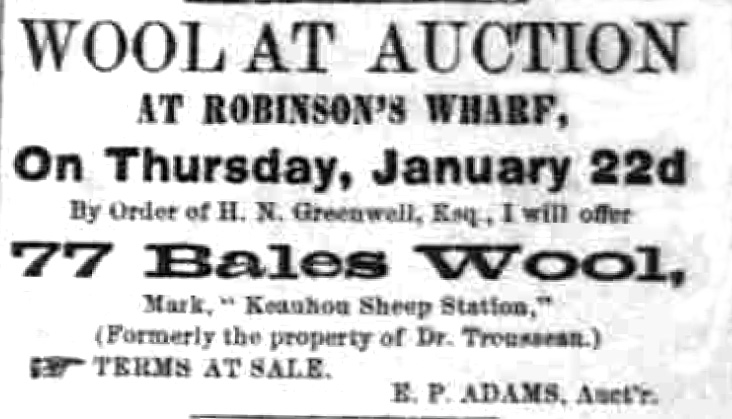
1880 advertisement: wool is usually not associated with tropical islands

Greenwell died 18 May 1891 aboard a steamer that he often took between the islands. He and many family members are buried at the Christ Church Episcopal cemetery, near the store on the Hawaii Belt Road. Elizabeth Greenwell operated the store after his death, and many children and grandchildren became active in farming and ranching on the nearby lands.

While the Reciprocity Treaty of 1875 had caused most large Hawaii coffee plantations to convert to sugarcane, this was not practical in the steep Kona district. Instead, small plots were leased to individual families, often Chinese, Japanese, or Portuguese immigrants after their labor contracts on sugarcane plantations expired. Quality improved further with the introduction of the Guatemalan variety via Hermann A. Widemann, which turned out to be well-adapted to higher elevations; it remains a popular variety through modern times.

First-born son William Henry Greenwell was born at Kalukalu 7 June 1869. His sons included Henry Alan Greenwell (1908–1919), Jack Brysson Greenwell (1910–1996) and another Henry Alan Greenwell (1919–1992). William H. Greenwell managed the business from 1891 until he died 17 June 1927 after an operation for appendicitis. William's wife Maud Annandale Johnstone (1883–1976), named for Annandale, Scotland where she was born, ran the store until the 1950s. The wooden house was torn down in the 1960s.

Second and third sons continued the ranching business divided into three main ranches after 1927. Fourth son Wilfrid Alan Greenwell was born 7 November 1878, graduated from Yale in 1905, became a lawyer and married Lulu J. Law in November 1910. He became a partner in the firm Robertson, Castle & Olson in Honolulu and died in 1931. Leonard Lanchester Greenwell was born 4 December 1884 married Dora Beebe in 1909 and died in January 1975 in California. Fifth son Julian Greenwell was born 2 September 1880 and died 20 May 1960. Daughter Dora Caroline Greenwell was born 15 October 1870, married Gerald E. Bryant 6 September 1894, and died in 1952. Daughter Elizabeth Greenwell was born in 1873, married Howard R. Bryant in 1893, and died in 1903. Daughter Christina Margaret Greenwell was born 16 September 1874, married Jordan Natscheff in 1910 and died in 1964.

=== Palani ranch ===
Francis Radcliffe (Frank or "Palani") Greenwell was born 26 August 1876, worked as a manager of Coffee and Tea plantations and cattle rancher. Frank served from 1903 through 1905 in the House of Representatives of the Territory of Hawaii, and some other government positions. Frank married Evelyn Violet Wallace (1888–1985) on 8 February 1910 and died 19 May 1966.

Frank Greenwell lived farther north, on the slopes of Hualālai, above present-day Palani Road at 19°41′14″N 155°58′24″W. Originally called the Honokohau Ranch for its traditional land division name, the ranch and the road from it to the shoreline became known by the Hawaiian variant of his name. Frank's oldest son Robert Francis Greenwell (1911–1992) managed Palani ranch after Frank's death.

Frank's son Radcliffe Leonard "Rally" Greenwell (1913–2006) went to work for Parker Ranch in 1934 and became manager in September 1962.

James Mallaby Greenwell (1915–2004) went to work for Parker Ranch when he was 18. He then worked at Hawaii Meat Company for 25 years, becoming its president until 1964. He then held management positions at Palani Ranch and organized the Lanihau Properties, LLC real estate company. He was inducted into the Paniolo Hall of Fame in 2001. The ranch had a herd of about 1600 head in 2004. His wife Martha Lowery (born 1920) became an artist. His son James Sherwood "Jimmy" Greenwell (born 1945) then took over the Palani ranch.

Robert Francis' son Robert Kelly Greenwell (born 1941) ran unsuccessfully for Mayor of Hawaii County in 2004, and in 2008 was elected to the Hawaii County Council. In July 2010 he was arrested after being stopped for speeding.

=== Kealakekua ranch ===
Arthur Leonard Greenwell was born 7 December 1871 married Beatrice Holdsworth 12 November 1912, and died 3 June 1951. Arthur's daughter Amy Beatrice Holdsworth Greenwell (1920–1974) attended Stanford University and served as a nurse in World War II. From 1953 to 1957 she served on a Historical Site Commission for the Territory. Amy established a garden to preserve the Kona Field System, and left it to the Bernice P. Bishop Museum on her death.

Arthur's son Sherwood Robert H. Greenwell (1919–2004) managed of Kealakekua Ranch from 1951 to 1989. He founded and was president of Kona Historical society, and became a County Supervisor 1954–55 and 1959–67, and Council member in 1968. Greenwell donated land for a county park which was named for Arthur Greenwell in 1963. Sherwood died 21 September 2004.

Kealakekua ranch was about 11,490 acres (4,650 ha) located south of Hōkūkano ranch at 19°29′46″N 155°53′17″W, with access via Greenwell Mountain Road. A ranching complex called Papaloa was built at over 5,000 feet (1,500 m) elevation at 19°30′23″N 155°47′45″W. Kealakekua ranch was sold to Sekin International of Japan in 1990 who proposed to build a golf course and 500 estates, but economic slowdowns caused Sekin to sell it in 2002 for less than half of the 1990 price. The area is now under a reforestation effort. Conservation easements on 9,000 acres (3,600 ha) were sold in 2007.

=== Hōkūkano ranch ===
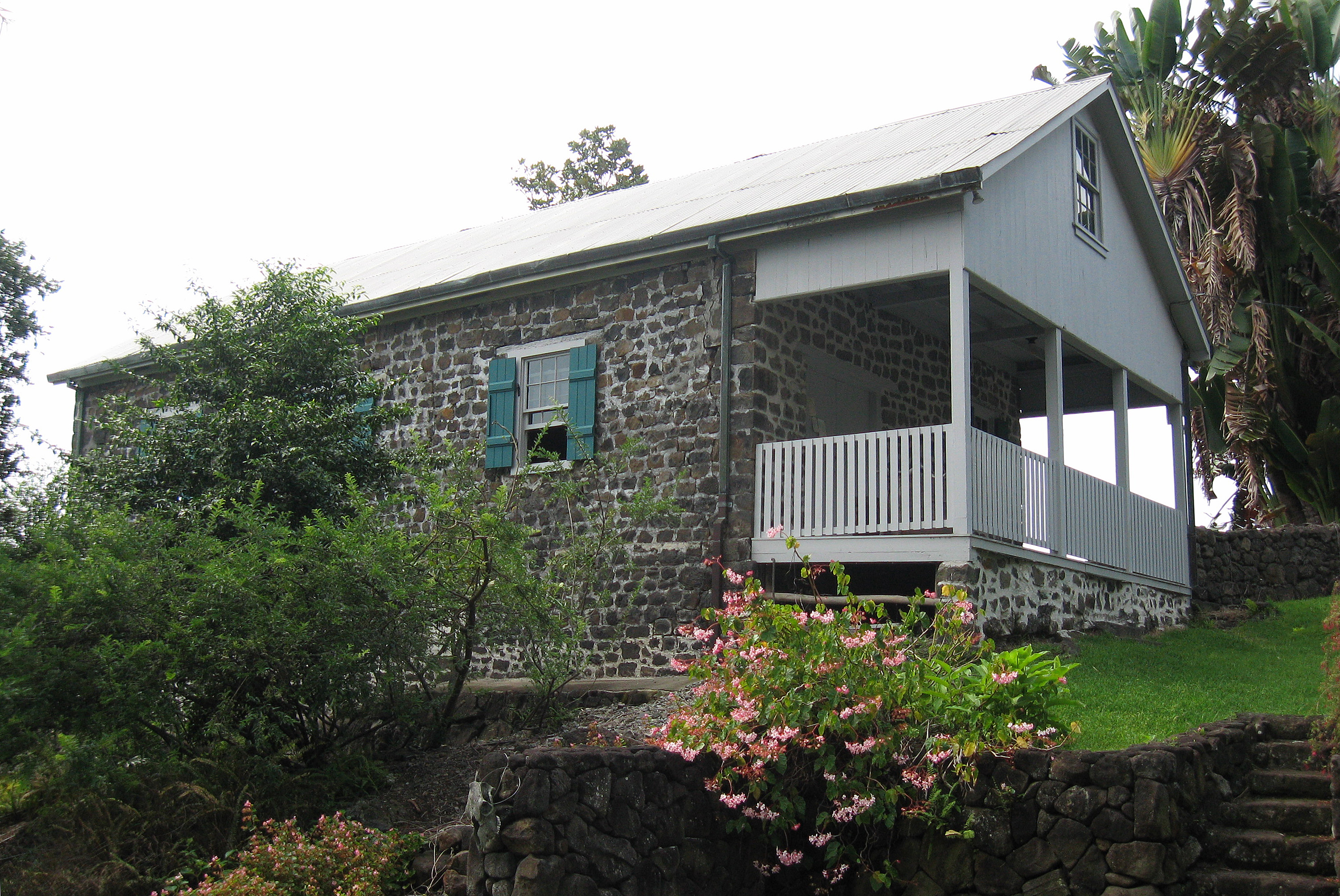
The Greenwell Store is now a museum

William H. Greenwell's son Norman Leonard Greenwell (1926–1992) managed the main W. H. Greenwell Estate ranch of 11,000 acres (4,500 ha) located 19°32′22″N 155°50′58″W, just uphill from the Kalukalu store. John Pace purchased it and renamed it Hōkūkano ranch in 1986, and also purchased Kealakekua ranch in 2004. Namesakes of the Pace family include Pace, Florida and the John C. Pace Library. The Pace family put the ranches up for sale in 2009. Hōkūkano ranch was divided into parcels between 400 acres (160 ha) and 1,000 acres (400 ha) for sale. In December 2009 a large fire broke out on Hōkūkano ranch, followed by another at Kealakekua ranch.

Norman's wife Jean Greenwell (1929–2009) was another founder of the Kona Historical society in 1976, and wrote articles on the area history. The Greenwell Store was added to the National Register of Historic Places listings on the island of Hawaii. The society restored the former store and opened it as a museum.

Norman's son Thomas Frederick born 2 June 1958 (great-grandson of Henry Nicholas) and his family still grow and sell coffee on a farm adjacent to the original homestead. Some of the trees were planted in 1903 by Elizabeth Caroline Greenwell. A recent venture was producing a reportedly healthy drink from the pulp of coffee cherries.

== Family tree ==
Greenwell family tree

William Thomas Greenwell (1777–1856)	Dorothy Smales (1789–1871)
William Greenwell (1820–1918)	Dora Greenwell (1821–1882)	Francis Greenwell (1823–1894); Alan Greenwell (1824–1914)	Henry Nicholas Greenwell (1826–1891)	Elizabeth Caroline Hall (1841–1934)
William Henry Greenwell (1869–1927)	Maud Annandale Johnstone (1883–1976)	Arthur Leonard Greenwell (1871–1951)	Francis Radcliffe (Frank) Greenwell (1876–1966)	Seven others
Norman Leonard Greenwell (1926-1992)	Jean Greenwell (1929–2009)	Amy B. H. Greenwell (1920-1974)	Robert Francis Greenwell (1911–1992)	"Rally" Greenwell (1913–2006)
Thomas Frederick Greenwell (born 1958)	Robert Kelly Greenwell (born 1941)
