= Kona District, Hawaii =

District on the Big Island of Hawaii

Coordinates: 19°41′58.56″N 155°59′24.00″W

Left to right: the North and South Kona districts, within the Big Island.

Kona is a moku or district on the Big Island of Hawaiʻi in the state of Hawaii, known for its Kona coffee and the Ironman World Championship Triathlon. In the administration of Hawaiʻi County, the moku of Kona is divided into North Kona District (Kona ʻAkau) and South Kona District (Kona Hema). "Kona" sometimes refers to its largest town, Kailua-Kona. Other towns in Kona include Kealakekua, Keauhou, Holualoa, Hōnaunau and Honalo.

== Description ==
In the Hawaiian language, kona means leeward or dry side of the island, as opposed to ko‘olau which means windward or the wet side of the island. In the times of Ancient Hawaiʻi, Kona was the name of the leeward district on each major island. In Hawai‘i, the Pacific anticyclone provides moist prevailing northeasterly winds to the Hawaiian islands, resulting in rain when the winds contact the windward landmass of the islands – the winds subsequently lose their moisture and travel on to the leeward (or kona) side of the island. When this pattern reverses, it can produce a Kona storm from the west. Kona has cognates with the same meaning in other Polynesian languages. In Tongan, the equivalent cognate would be tonga; for windward, the associated cognate would be tokelau.

Kona is the home of the Ironman World Championship Triathlon, which is held each year in October in Kailua-Kona. The Kealakekua Bay State Historical Park marks the place where Captain James Cook was killed in 1779. Puʻuhonua o Hōnaunau National Historical Park and Honokohau Settlement and Kaloko-Honokohau National Historical Park are in Kona.

The volcanic slopes of Hualālai and Mauna Loa in the Kona district provide an ideal microclimate for growing coffee. Kona coffee is considered one of the premium specialty coffees of the world.

Kona is the home of one of the main bases of the international Christian mission organization YWAM, and the University of the Nations, first founded there.

== In popular culture ==
- The region served as the basis of the Beach Boys' song "Kona Coast" from their 1978 album M.I.U. Album.
- Asteroid 284891 Kona, discovered by astronomers at the ESA Optical Ground Station in 2009, was named after the Hawaiian district. The official naming citation was published by the Minor Planet Center on 16 January 2014 (M.P.C. 86717).

== Transportation ==
Kona International Airport is in North Kona.

== Gallery ==
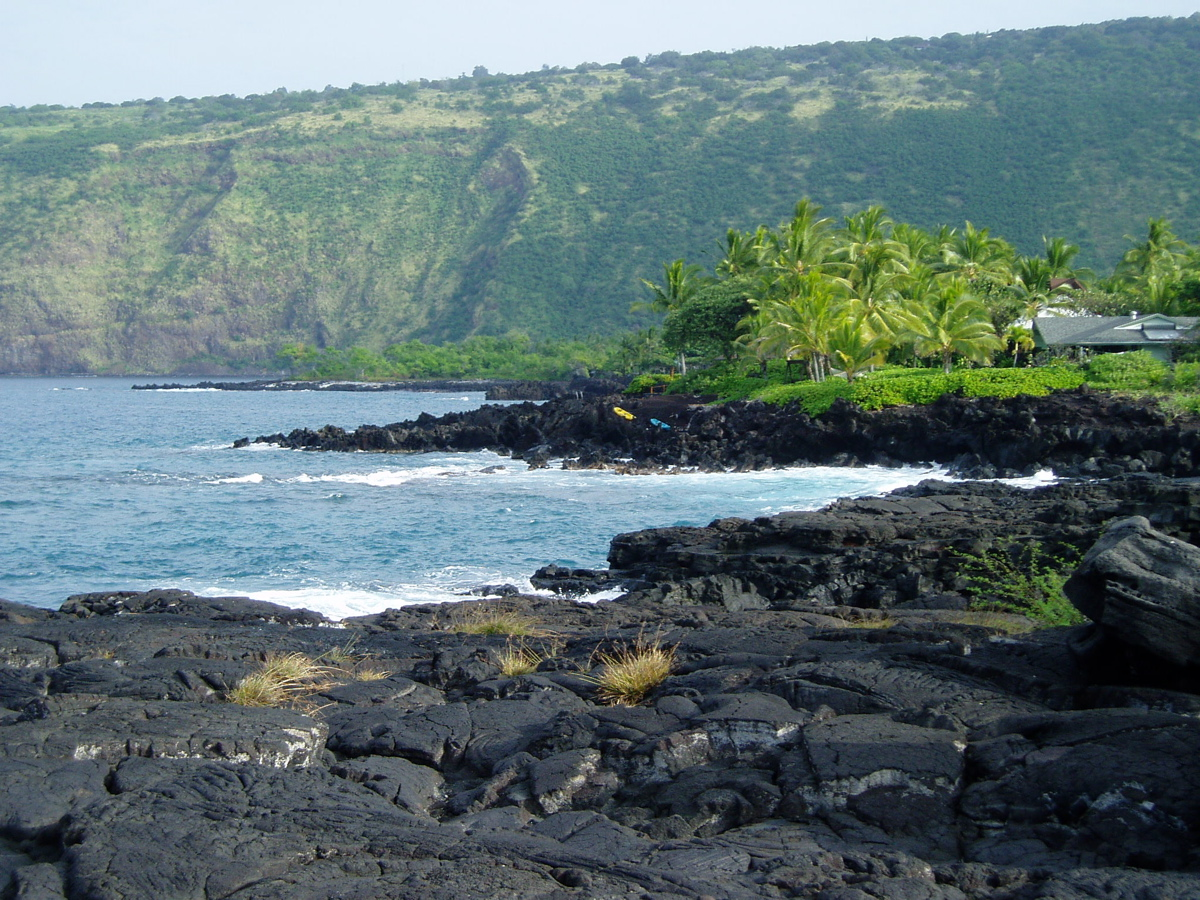
Kealakekua Bay

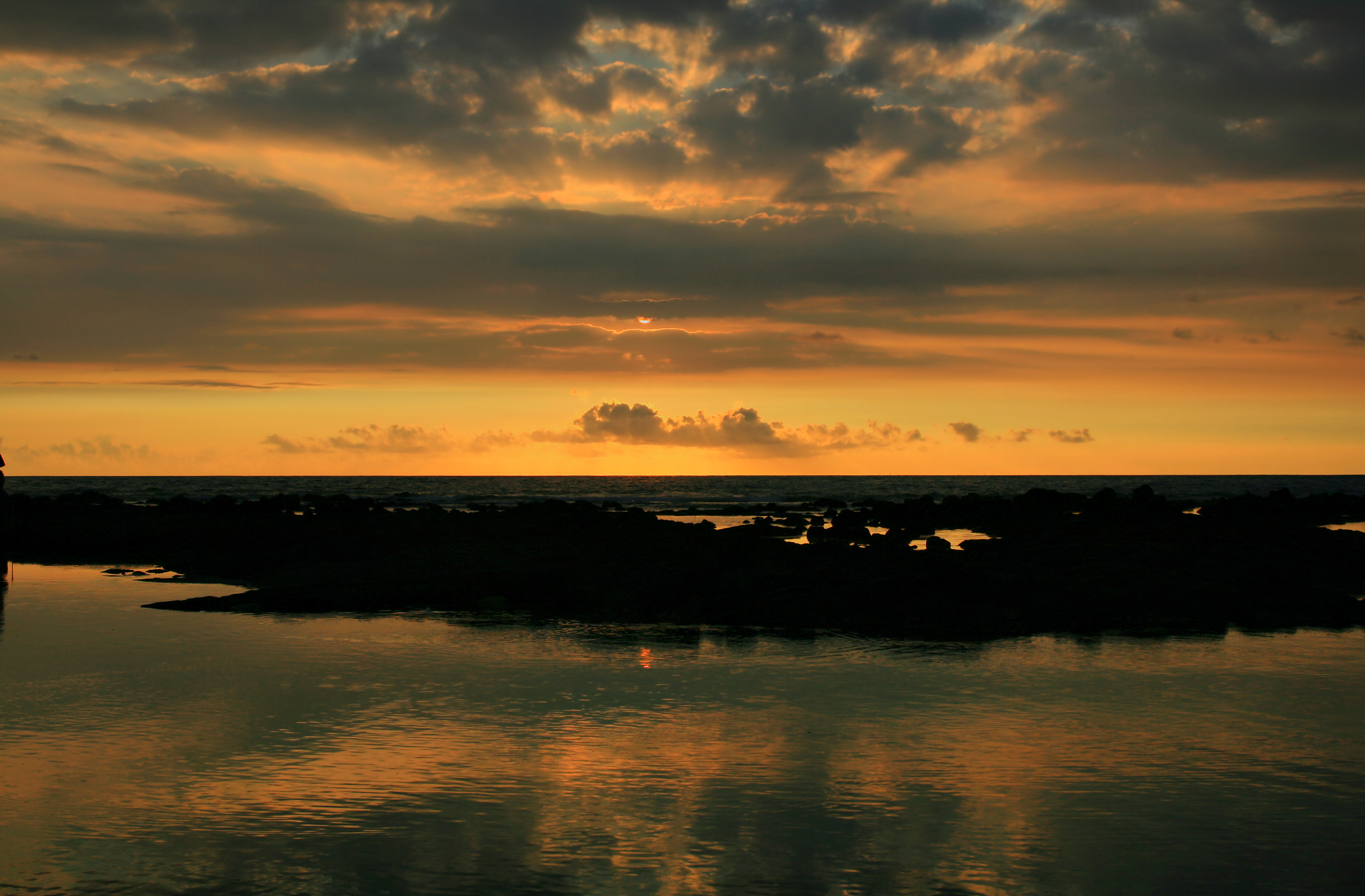
Sunset in Kona

Canoe Hale at Honaunau Bay

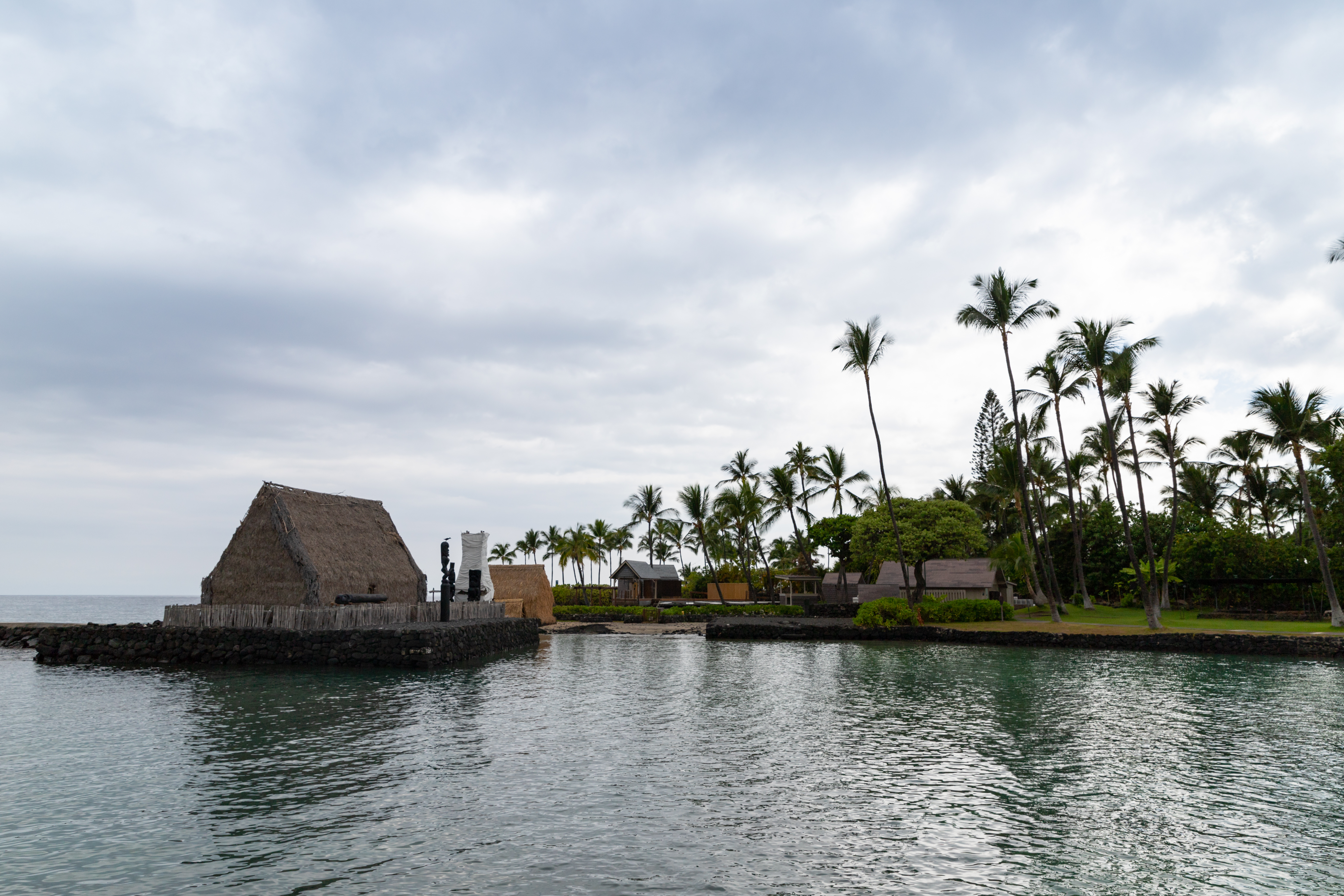
Plymouth Rock, Kailua Kona, Big island, Hawaii

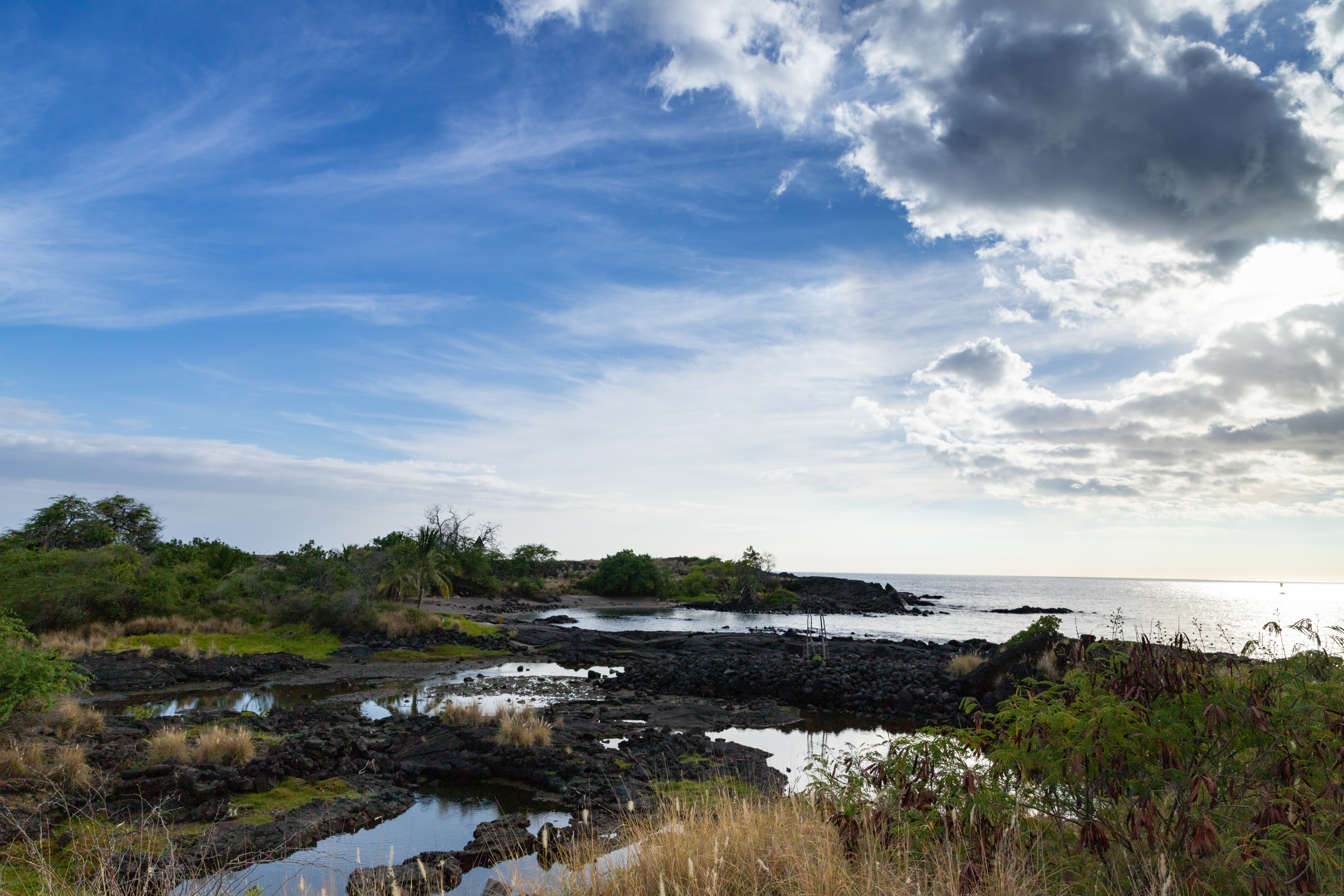
Kona Dog Beach, Big island, Hawaii
