= May 21 =

May 21 this year in various calendars
- Thursday, 21 May 2026
Akan	Kwayaw
Armenian	5 Margach 1475
Aztec	Ochpaniztli 11, 2 Quiyahuitl
Babylonian	3 Ayaru, 2337 SE
Balinese pawukon	Luang, Pepet, Beteng, Jaya, Pon, Was, Wraspati of Wariga, Kala, Tulus, Manuh
Bengali	7 Joishtho, BS 1433
Chinese	Yin Wood Goat・Well Mansion; Fire Horse Year, Month 4, Day 5 (Xiaoman, 15 days until Mangzhong)
Common Era	21 May 2026 CE
Coptic	13 Pashons, AM 1742
Egyptian	5 Phaophi, 2775 NE
Ethiopian	13 Genbot, 2018 Amätä Məhrät
French Republican	Décade I, Duodi de Prairial de l'Année 234 de la République
Gregorian	21 May, AD 2026
Hebrew	5 Sivan, AM 5786; Omer 49
Hindu	Punarvasu・Gaṇḍa; Solar: 7 Jyeṣṭha, 1948 SE; Lunisolar: Pañcamī, Śukla pakṣa of Adhika Jyeṣṭha, 2083 VE; Rāudra・5127 KY・1,872,716
Icelandic	Fimmtudagur, 29 Harpa 2026
Islamic	4 Dhu al-Hijjah, AH 1447 (using tabular method)
ISO week date	2026-W21-4
Japanese	5 Uzuki, Reiwa 8 (Shōman, 16 days until Bōshu)
Julian	8 May, AD 2026 (AM 7534)
Julian day	2461182
Korean	5 Baemdal, 4359 DE
Maya	13.0.13.10.19; 12 Zip, 2 Cauac
Roman	ante diem VIII Idus Maias, MMDCCLXXIX AUC
Solar Hijri	31 Ordibehesht, SH 1405
Tibetan	5 sa ga, me pho rta 2153 or 1772 or 1000

<<	May					>>
Su	Mo	Tu	We	Th	Fr	Sa
					1	2
3	4	5	6	7	8	9
10	11	12	13	14	15	16
17	18	19	20	21	22	23
24	25	26	27	28	29	30
31
2026

May 21 in recent years
2026 (Thursday)
2025 (Wednesday)
2024 (Tuesday)
2023 (Sunday)
2022 (Saturday)
2021 (Friday)
2020 (Thursday)
2019 (Tuesday)
2018 (Monday)
2017 (Sunday)

May 21 is the 141st day of the year (142nd in leap years) in the Gregorian calendar; 224 days remain until the end of the year.

== Events ==
=== Pre-1600 ===
- 293 – Roman Emperors Diocletian and Maximian appoint Galerius as Caesar to Diocletian, beginning the period of four rulers known as the Tetrarchy.
- 878 – Syracuse, Sicily, is captured by the Muslim Aghlabids after a nine-month siege.
- 879 – Pope John VIII gives blessings to Branimir of Croatia and to the Croatian people, considered to be international recognition of the Croatian state.
- 996 – Sixteen-year-old Otto III is crowned Holy Roman Emperor.
- 1294 – Coronation of Michael IX Palaiologos as Byzantine Emperor.
- 1347 – Coronation of John VI Kantakouzenos as Byzantine Emperor by patriarch Isidore I of Constantinople at the Church of St. Mary of Blachernae.
- 1349 – Dušan's Code, the constitution of the Serbian Empire, is enacted by Dušan the Mighty.
- 1403 – Henry III of Castile sends Ruy González de Clavijo as ambassador to Timur to discuss the possibility of an alliance between Timur and Castile against the Ottoman Empire.
- 1424 – Coronation of James I of Scotland at Scone.
- 1554 – Queen Mary I grants a royal charter to Derby School, as a grammar school for boys in Derby, England.

=== 1601–1900 ===
- 1659 – In the Concert of The Hague, the Dutch Republic, the Commonwealth of England and the Kingdom of France set out their views on how the Second Northern War should end.
- 1660 – The Battle of Long Sault concludes after five days in which French colonial militia, with their Huron and Algonquin allies, are defeated by the Haudenosaunee Confederacy.
- 1674 – The nobility elect John Sobieski King of Poland and Grand Duke of Lithuania.
- 1703 – Daniel Defoe is imprisoned on charges of seditious libel.
- 1725 – The Order of St. Alexander Nevsky is instituted in Russia by Empress Catherine I. It would later be discontinued and then reinstated by the Soviet government in 1942 as the Order of Alexander Nevsky.
- 1758 – Ten-year-old Mary Campbell is abducted in Pennsylvania by Lenape during the French and Indian War. She is returned six and a half years later.
- 1792 – A lava dome collapses on Mount Unzen, near the city of Shimbara on the Japanese island of Kyūshū, creating a deadly tsunami that killed nearly 15,000 people.
- 1799 – The end of the Siege of Acre (1799): Napoleon Bonaparte abandons his siege of the Ottoman city of Acre after two months. This was the turning point of Bonaparte's Egyptian campaign and one of the first major defeats he suffered in his military career.
- 1809 – The first day of the Battle of Aspern-Essling between the Austrian army led by Archduke Charles and the French army led by Napoleon I of France sees the French attack across the Danube held.
- 1851 – Slavery in Colombia is abolished.
- 1856 – Lawrence, Kansas is captured and burned by pro-slavery forces.
- 1863 – American Civil War: The Union Army succeeds in closing off the last escape route from Port Hudson, Louisiana, in preparation for the coming siege.
- 1864 – Russia declares an end to the Russo-Circassian War and many Circassians are forced into exile. The day is designated the Circassian Day of Mourning.
- 1864 – American Civil War: The Battle of Spotsylvania Court House ends.
- 1864 – The Ionian Islands reunite with Greece.
- 1871 – French troops invade the Paris Commune and engage its residents in street fighting. By the close of "Bloody Week", some 20,000 communards have been killed and 38,000 arrested.
- 1871 – Opening of the first rack railway in Europe, the Rigi Bahnen on Mount Rigi.
- 1879 – War of the Pacific: Two Chilean ships blocking the harbor of Iquique (then belonging to Peru) battle two Peruvian vessels in the Battle of Iquique.
- 1881 – The American Red Cross is established by Clara Barton in Dansville, New York.
- 1894 – The Manchester Ship Canal in the United Kingdom is officially opened by Queen Victoria, who later knights its designer Sir Edward Leader Williams.

=== 1901–present ===
- 1904 – The Fédération Internationale de Football Association (FIFA) is founded in Paris.
- 1911 – President of Mexico Porfirio Díaz and the revolutionary Francisco Madero sign the Treaty of Ciudad Juárez to put an end to the fighting between the forces of both men, concluding the initial phase of the Mexican Revolution.
- 1917 – The Imperial War Graves Commission is established through royal charter to mark, record, and maintain the graves and places of commemoration of the British Empire's military forces.
- 1917 – The Great Atlanta fire of 1917 causes $5.5 million in damages, destroying some 300 acres including 2,000 homes, businesses and churches, displacing about 10,000 people but leading to only one fatality (due to heart attack).
- 1924 – University of Chicago students Richard Loeb and Nathan Leopold, Jr. murder 14-year-old Bobby Franks in a "thrill killing".
- 1925 – The opera Doktor Faust, unfinished when composer Ferruccio Busoni died, is premiered in Dresden.
- 1927 – Charles Lindbergh touches down at Le Bourget Field in Paris, completing the world's first solo nonstop flight across the Atlantic Ocean.
- 1932 – Bad weather forces Amelia Earhart to land in a pasture in Derry, Northern Ireland, and she thereby becomes the first woman to fly solo across the Atlantic Ocean.
- 1934 – Oskaloosa, Iowa, becomes the first municipality in the United States to fingerprint all of its citizens.
- 1936 – Sada Abe is arrested after wandering the streets of Tokyo for days with her dead lover's severed genitals in her handbag. Her story soon becomes one of Japan's most notorious scandals.
- 1937 – A Soviet station, North Pole-1, becomes the first scientific research settlement to operate on the drift ice of the Arctic Ocean.
- 1939 – The Canadian National War Memorial is unveiled by King George VI and Queen Elizabeth in Ottawa, Ontario, Canada.
- 1946 – Physicist Louis Slotin is fatally irradiated in a criticality incident during an experiment with the demon core at Los Alamos National Laboratory.
- 1951 – The opening of the Ninth Street Show, otherwise known as the 9th Street Art Exhibition: A gathering of a number of notable artists, and the stepping-out of the post war New York avant-garde, collectively known as the New York School.
- 1961 – American civil rights movement: Alabama Governor John Malcolm Patterson declares martial law in an attempt to restore order after race riots break out.
- 1966 – The Ulster Volunteer Force declares war on the Irish Republican Army in Northern Ireland.
- 1969 – Civil unrest in Rosario, Argentina, known as Rosariazo, following the death of a 15-year-old student.
- 1972 – Michelangelo's Pietà in St. Peter's Basilica in Rome is damaged by a vandal, the mentally disturbed Hungarian geologist Laszlo Toth.
- 1976 – Twenty-nine people are killed in the Yuba City bus disaster in Martinez, California.
- 1979 – White Night riots in San Francisco following the manslaughter conviction of Dan White for the assassinations of George Moscone and Harvey Milk.
- 1981 – The Italian government releases the membership list of Propaganda Due, an illegal pseudo-Masonic lodge that was implicated in numerous Italian crimes and mysteries.
- 1981 – Transamerica Corporation agrees to sell United Artists to Metro-Goldwyn-Mayer for $380 million after the box office failure of the 1980 film Heaven's Gate.
- 1982 – Falklands War: A British amphibious assault during Operation Sutton leads to the Battle of San Carlos.
- 1988 – Margaret Thatcher holds her controversial Sermon on the Mound before the General Assembly of the Church of Scotland.
- 1991 – Former Indian Prime Minister Rajiv Gandhi is assassinated by a female suicide bomber near Madras.
- 1991 – Mengistu Haile Mariam, president of the People's Democratic Republic of Ethiopia, flees Ethiopia, effectively bringing the Ethiopian Civil War to an end.
- 1992 – After 30 seasons Johnny Carson hosts his penultimate episode and last featuring guests (Robin Williams and Bette Midler) of The Tonight Show.
- 1994 – The Democratic Republic of Yemen unsuccessfully attempts to secede from the Republic of Yemen; a war breaks out.
- 1996 – The ferry MV Bukoba sinks in Tanzanian waters on Lake Victoria, killing nearly 1,000.
- 1996 – The seven Trappist monks of Tibhirine who were abducted on March 27 are killed under uncertain circumstances.
- 1998 – In Miami, five abortion clinics are attacked by a butyric acid attacker.
- 1998 – President Suharto of Indonesia resigns following the killing of students from Trisakti University earlier that week by security forces and growing mass protests in Jakarta against his ongoing corrupt rule.
- 2000 – Nineteen people are killed in a plane crash in Wilkes-Barre, Pennsylvania.
- 2001 – French Taubira law is enacted, officially recognizing the Atlantic slave trade and slavery as crimes against humanity.
- 2003 – The 6.8 M_{w} Boumerdès earthquake shakes northern Algeria with a maximum Mercalli intensity of X (Extreme). More than 2,200 people were killed and a moderate tsunami sank boats at the Balearic Islands.
- 2005 – The tallest roller coaster in the world, Kingda Ka opens at Six Flags Great Adventure in Jackson Township, New Jersey.
- 2006 – The Republic of Montenegro holds a referendum proposing independence from the State Union of Serbia and Montenegro; 55% of Montenegrins vote for independence.
- 2010 – JAXA, the Japan Aerospace Exploration Agency, launches the solar-sail spacecraft IKAROS aboard an H-IIA rocket. The vessel would make a Venus flyby late in the year.
- 2011 – Radio broadcaster Harold Camping predicted that the world would end on this date.
- 2012 – A bus accident near Himara, Albania kills 13 people and injures 21 others.
- 2012 – A suicide bombing kills more than 120 people in Sanaa, Yemen.
- 2014 – Random killings occur on the Bannan Line of the Taipei MRT, killing four and injuring 24.
- 2017 – Ringling Bros. and Barnum & Bailey Circus perform their final show at Nassau Veterans Memorial Coliseum.
- 2024 – The Greenfield tornado kills five and injures 35 across rural Iowa, United States. Wind speeds in excess of 480 kilometres per hour (300 mph) are estimated from measurements for the third time in history.
- 2024 – A stabbing spree on the Green line of the Taichung MRT injures four people, including the perpetrator.

== Births ==
=== Pre-1600 ===
- 1471 – Albrecht Dürer, German painter, engraver, and mathematician (died 1528)
- 1497 – Al-Hattab, Muslim jurist (died 1547)
- 1527 – Philip II of Spain, King of Spain, Portugal, England and Ireland (died 1598)

=== 1601–1900 ===
- 1653 – Eleonore of Austria, Queen of Poland (died 1697)
- 1688 – (O.S.) Alexander Pope, English poet, essayist, and translator (died 1744)
- 1755 – Alfred Moore, American lawyer and judge (died 1810)
- 1756 – William Babington, Irish-born, English physician and mineralogist (died 1833)
- 1759 – Joseph Fouché, French lawyer and politician (died 1820)
- 1775 – Lucien Bonaparte, French soldier and politician (died 1840)
- 1780 – Elizabeth Fry, English prison reformer, philanthropist and Quaker (died 1845)
- 1790 – William Cavendish, 6th Duke of Devonshire, English politician, Lord Chamberlain of the Household (died 1858)
- 1792 – Gaspard-Gustave de Coriolis, French mathematician and engineer (died 1843)
- 1799 – Mary Anning, English paleontologist (died 1847)
- 1801 – Princess Sophie of Sweden, Swedish princess (died 1865)
- 1806 – Harriet Sutherland-Leveson-Gower, Duchess of Sutherland, English duchess (died 1868)
- 1808 – David de Jahacob Lopez Cardozo, Dutch Talmudist (died 1890)
- 1827 – William P. Sprague, American banker and politician (died 1899)
- 1828 – Rudolf Koller, Swiss painter (died 1905)
- 1835 – František Chvostek, Czech-Austrian physician and academic (died 1884)
- 1837 – Itagaki Taisuke, Japanese soldier and politician (died 1919)
- 1843 – Charles Albert Gobat, Swiss lawyer and politician, and Nobel Prize laureate (died 1914)
- 1843 – Louis Renault, French jurist, educator, and Nobel Prize laureate (died 1918)
- 1844 – Henri Rousseau, French painter (died 1910)
- 1849 – Édouard-Henri Avril, French painter (died 1928)
- 1850 – Giuseppe Mercalli, Italian priest and volcanologist (died 1914)
- 1851 – Léon Bourgeois, French police officer and politician, 64th Prime Minister of France, Nobel Prize laureate (died 1925)
- 1853 – Jacques Marie Eugène Godefroy Cavaignac, French politician (died 1905)
- 1855 – Ella Stewart Udall, American telegraphist (died 1937)
- 1856 – José Batlle y Ordóñez, Uruguayan journalist and politician, President of Uruguay (died 1929)
- 1858 – Édouard Goursat, French mathematician (died 1936)
- 1860 – Willem Einthoven, Indonesian-Dutch physician, physiologist, and academic, Nobel Prize laureate (died 1927)
- 1861 – Abel Ayerza, Argentinian physician and academic (died 1918)
- 1863 – Archduke Eugen of Austria (died 1954)
- 1864 – Princess Stéphanie of Belgium (died 1945)
- 1867 – Anne Walter Fearn, American physician (died 1939)
- 1873 – Hans Berger, German neurologist and academic (died 1941)
- 1878 – Glenn Curtiss, American cyclist and engineer (died 1930)
- 1880 – Tudor Arghezi, Romanian journalist, author, and poet (died 1967)
- 1884 – Manuel Pérez y Curis, Uruguayan poet and publisher (died 1920)
- 1885 – Princess Sophie of Albania, (Princess Sophie of Schönburg-Waldenburg) (died 1936)
- 1893 – Arthur Carr, English cricketer (died 1963)
- 1893 – Giles Chippindall, Australian public servant (died 1969)
- 1895 – Lázaro Cárdenas, Mexican general, president (1934–1940) and father of Cuauhtémoc Cárdenas (died 1970)
- 1898 – Armand Hammer, American physician and businessman, founded Occidental Petroleum (died 1990)
- 1898 – Charles Léon Hammes, Luxembourgian lawyer and judge (died 1967)
- 1898 – Carl Johnson, American long jumper (died 1932)
- 1898 – John McLaughlin, American painter and translator (died 1976)

=== 1901–present ===
- 1901 – Regina M. Anderson, Multiracial playwright and librarian (died 1993)
- 1901 – Horace Heidt, American pianist, bandleader, and radio host (died 1986)
- 1901 – Sam Jaffe, American film producer and agent (died 2000)
- 1901 – Suzanne Lilar, Belgian author and playwright (died 1992)
- 1902 – Earl Averill, American baseball player (died 1983)
- 1902 – Marcel Breuer, Hungarian-American architect and academic, designed the Ameritrust Tower (died 1981)
- 1902 – Anatole Litvak, Ukrainian-American director, producer, and screenwriter (died 1974)
- 1903 – Manly Wade Wellman, American author (died 1986)
- 1904 – Robert Montgomery, American actor and director (died 1981)
- 1904 – Fats Waller, American singer-songwriter and pianist (died 1943)
- 1907 – John C. Allen, American roller coaster designer (died 1979)
- 1912 – Chen Dayu, Chinese painter and calligrapher (died 2001)
- 1912 – John Curtis Gowan, American psychologist and academic (died 1986)
- 1912 – Monty Stratton, American baseball player and coach (died 1982)
- 1913 – Gina Bachauer, Greek pianist and composer (died 1976)
- 1914 – Romain Gary, French novelist, diplomat, film director, aviator (died 1980)
- 1915 – Chakravarthi V. Narasimhan, Indian Civil Service Officer and former Under Secretary-General of the UN (died 2003)
- 1916 – Dennis Day, American singer and actor (died 1988)
- 1916 – Tinus Osendarp, Dutch sprinter and police officer (died 2002)
- 1916 – Harold Robbins, American author and screenwriter (died 1997)
- 1917 – Raymond Burr, Canadian-American actor and director (died 1993)
- 1919 – George P. Mitchell, American businessman and philanthropist (died 2013)
- 1920 – Bill Barber, American tuba player and educator (died 2007)
- 1920 – Forrest White, American businessman, co-founded the Music Man Company (died 1994)
- 1921 – Sandy Douglas, English computer scientist and academic, designed OXO (died 2010)
- 1921 – Andrei Sakharov, Russian physicist and academic, Nobel Prize laureate (died 1989)
- 1923 – Vernon Biever, American photographer (died 2010)
- 1923 – Armand Borel, Swiss-American mathematician and academic (died 2003)
- 1923 – Ara Parseghian, American football player and coach (died 2017)
- 1923 – Dorothy Hewett, Australian feminist poet, novelist and playwright (died 2002)
- 1923 – Evelyn Ward, American actress (died 2012)
- 1924 – Peggy Cass, American actress, comedian, and game show panelist (died 1999)
- 1926 – Robert Creeley, American novelist, essayist, and poet (died 2005)
- 1926 – Albert Grossman, American music manager (died 1986)
- 1927 – Kay Kendall, English actress and comedian (died 1959)
- 1927 – Péter Zwack, Hungarian businessman and diplomat (died 2012)
- 1928 – Tom Donahue, American radio host and producer (died 1975)
- 1928 – Alice Drummond, American actress (died 2016)
- 1929 – Larance Marable, American drummer (died 2012)
- 1929 – Robert Welch, English silversmith and industrial designer (died 2000)
- 1930 – Tommy Bryant, American bassist (died 1982)
- 1930 – Keith Davis, New Zealand rugby player (died 2019)
- 1930 – Malcolm Fraser, Australian politician, 22nd Prime Minister of Australia (died 2015)
- 1932 – Inese Jaunzeme, Latvian javelin thrower and surgeon (died 2011)
- 1932 – Leonidas Vasilikopoulos, Greek admiral and intelligence chief (died 2014)
- 1933 – Maurice André, French trumpet player (died 2012)
- 1933 – Yevgeny Minayev, Russian weightlifter (died 1993)
- 1934 – Jocasta Innes, Chinese-English journalist and author (died 2013)
- 1934 – Bob Northern, American horn player and bandleader (died 2020)
- 1934 – Bengt I. Samuelsson, Swedish biochemist and academic, Nobel Prize laureate (died 2024)
- 1935 – Terry Lightfoot, English clarinet player and bandleader (died 2013)
- 1936 – Günter Blobel, Polish-American biologist and academic, Nobel Prize laureate (died 2018)
- 1938 – Lee "Shot" Williams, American singer (died 2011)
- 1939 – Heinz Holliger, Swiss oboist, composer, and conductor
- 1940 – Tony Sheridan, English singer-songwriter and guitarist (died 2013)
- 1941 – Martin Carthy, English singer-songwriter, guitarist, and producer
- 1941 – Bobby Cox, American baseball player and manager (died 2026)
- 1941 – Ambrose Greenway, 4th Baron Greenway, English photographer and politician
- 1941 – Ronald Isley, American singer-songwriter and producer
- 1942 – David Hunt, Baron Hunt of Wirral, English politician, Secretary of State for Wales
- 1942 – John Konrads, Australian swimmer (died 2021)
- 1942 – Danny Ongais, American race car driver (died 2022)
- 1943 – Vincent Crane, English pianist and composer (died 1989)
- 1943 – John Dalton, English bass player
- 1943 – Hilton Valentine, English guitarist and songwriter (died 2021)
- 1944 – Haleh Afshar, Baroness Afshar, Iranian-English academic and politician (died 2022)
- 1944 – Marcie Blane, American singer
- 1944 – Janet Dailey, American author and entrepreneur (died 2013)
- 1944 – Mary Robinson, Irish lawyer and politician, President of Ireland
- 1945 – Ernst Messerschmid, German physicist and astronaut
- 1945 – Richard Hatch, American actor, writer, and producer (died 2017)
- 1946 – Allan McKeown, English-American screenwriter and producer (died 2013)
- 1946 – Wayne Roycroft, Australian equestrian rider and coach
- 1947 – Bill Champlin, American singer-songwriter, guitarist, and producer
- 1947 – Linda Laubenstein, American physician and academic (died 1992)
- 1947 – İlber Ortaylı, Turkish historian and academic (died 2026)
- 1948 – Elizabeth Buchan, English author and critic
- 1948 – Joe Camilleri, Maltese-Australian singer-songwriter and saxophonist
- 1948 – Jonathan Hyde, Australian-English actor
- 1948 – Denis MacShane, Scottish journalist and politician, UK Minister of State for Europe
- 1948 – Leo Sayer, English-Australian singer-songwriter and musician
- 1949 – Andrew Neil, Scottish journalist and academic
- 1949 – Denis O'Connor, British police officer
- 1949 – Rosalind Plowright, English soprano
- 1950 – Will Hutton, English economist and journalist
- 1951 – Al Franken, American actor, screenwriter, and politician
- 1951 – Adrian Hardiman, Irish lawyer and judge (died 2016)
- 1952 – Mr. T, American actor and wrestler
- 1953 – Nora Aunor, Filipino actress and recording artist (died 2025)
- 1953 – Jim Devine, British politician
- 1954 – Marc Ribot, American guitarist and composer
- 1955 – Paul Barber, English field hockey player
- 1955 – Stan Lynch, American drummer, songwriter, and producer
- 1957 – James Bailey, American basketball player
- 1957 – Nadine Dorries, English politician
- 1957 – Judge Reinhold, American actor and producer
- 1957 – Renée Soutendijk, Dutch actress
- 1958 – Christian Audigier, French fashion designer (died 2015)
- 1958 – Muffy Calder, Canadian-Scottish computer scientist and academic
- 1958 – Michael Crick, English journalist and author
- 1958 – Naeem Khan, Indian-American fashion designer
- 1958 – Jefery Levy, American director, producer, and screenwriter
- 1958 – Curtis T. McMullen, American mathematician, 1998 Fields medalist
- 1959 – Nick Cassavetes, American actor, director, and screenwriter
- 1959 – Abdulla Yameen, Maldivian politician, 6th President of the Maldives
- 1960 – Jeffrey Dahmer, American serial killer (died 1994)
- 1960 – Kent Hrbek, American baseball player and sportscaster
- 1960 – Mohanlal, Indian actor
- 1960 – Mark Ridgway, Australian cricketer
- 1960 – Vladimir Salnikov, Russian swimmer
- 1962 – David Crumb, American composer and educator
- 1963 – Richard Appel, American screenwriter and producer
- 1963 – Patrick Grant, American musician and producer
- 1963 – David Lonsdale, English actor
- 1963 – Dave Specter, American guitarist
- 1963 – Laurie Spina, Australian rugby league player and sportscaster
- 1964 – Danny Bailey, English footballer and coach
- 1964 – Pete Sandoval, Salvadoran-American drummer
- 1966 – Lisa Edelstein, American actress and playwright
- 1966 – Tatyana Ledovskaya, Belarusian hurdler
- 1967 – Chris Benoit, Canadian professional wrestler (died 2007)
- 1967 – Alain Yzermans, Belgian politician
- 1968 – Ilmar Raag, Estonian director, producer, and screenwriter
- 1968 – Matthias Ungemach, German-Australian rower
- 1968 – Julie Vega, Filipino actress and singer (died 1985)
- 1969 – Pierluigi Brivio, Italian footballer
- 1969 – Georgiy Gongadze, Georgian-Ukrainian journalist and director (died 2000)
- 1969 – Masayo Kurata, Japanese voice actress and singer
- 1969 – George LeMieux, American lawyer and politician
- 1969 – Brian Statham, Rhodesian born English footballer and manager
- 1970 – Brigita Bukovec, Slovenian hurdler
- 1970 – Dorsey Levens, American football player and sportscaster
- 1970 – Pauline Menczer, Australian surfer
- 1970 – Carl Veart, Australian footballer and coach
- 1971 – Shane Cloete, Zimbabwean-British ex-cricketer and teacher
- 1972 – The Notorious B.I.G., American rapper (died 1997)
- 1973 – Stewart Cink, American golfer
- 1973 – Noel Fielding, English comedian, musician and television presenter
- 1974 – Brad Arthur, Australian rugby league coach
- 1974 – Fairuza Balk, American actress
- 1974 – Havoc, American rapper and producer
- 1975 – Marc-Vivien Foé, Cameroonian footballer (died 2003)
- 1975 – Anthony Mundine, Australian rugby league player and boxer
- 1976 – Stuart Bingham, English snooker player
- 1976 – Abderrahim Goumri, Moroccan runner (died 2013)
- 1976 – Deron Miller, American singer-songwriter and guitarist
- 1977 – Quinton Fortune, South African international footballer and coach
- 1977 – Michael Fuß, German footballer
- 1977 – Ricky Williams, American football player
- 1978 – Max B, American rapper and songwriter
- 1978 – Briana Banks, German-American porn actress and model
- 1978 – Jamaal Magloire, Canadian basketball player and coach
- 1979 – Damián Ariel Álvarez, Argentinian-Mexican footballer
- 1979 – Jamie Hepburn, Scottish politician, Minister for Sport, Health Improvement and Mental Health
- 1979 – James Clancy Phelan, Australian author and academic
- 1979 – Scott Smith, American mixed martial artist
- 1980 – Gotye, Belgian-Australian singer-songwriter
- 1981 – Craig Anderson, American ice hockey player
- 1981 – Edson Buddle, American soccer player
- 1981 – Josh Hamilton, American baseball player
- 1981 – Maximilian Mutzke, German singer-songwriter
- 1981 – Anna Rogowska, Polish pole vaulter
- 1983 – Līga Dekmeijere, Latvian tennis player
- 1983 – Deidson Araújo Maia, Brazilian footballer
- 1984 – Brandon Fields, American football player
- 1984 – Sara Goller, German volleyball player
- 1985 – Mark Cavendish, Manx cyclist
- 1985 – Alexander Dale Oen, Norwegian swimmer (died 2012)
- 1985 – Isa Guha, English cricketer and sportscaster
- 1985 – Lucie Hradecká, Czech tennis player
- 1985 – Kano, English rapper, producer, and actor
- 1985 – Dušan Kuciak, Slovak footballer
- 1985 – Heath L'Estrange, Australian rugby league player
- 1985 – Andrew Miller, American baseball player
- 1986 – Mario Mandžukić, Croatian footballer
- 1986 – Myra, American singer and actress
- 1986 – Eder Sánchez, Mexican race walker
- 1986 – Park Sojin, South Korean singer-songwriter and dancer
- 1986 – Greg Stewart, Canadian ice hockey player
- 1986 – Matt Wieters, American baseball player
- 1987 – Beau Falloon, Australian rugby league player
- 1988 – Claire Cashmore, English Paralympic swimmer
- 1988 – Park Gyu-ri, South Korean singer
- 1988 – Jonny Howson, English footballer
- 1988 – Kaire Leibak, Estonian triple jumper
- 1989 – Emily Robins, New Zealand actress and singer
- 1989 – Hal Robson-Kanu, Welsh footballer
- 1990 – Kierre Beckles, Barbadian athlete
- 1990 – Rene Krhin, Slovenian footballer
- 1991 – Guilherme, Brazilian footballer
- 1992 – Hutch Dano, American actor
- 1992 – Lisa Evans, Scottish footballer
- 1992 – Philipp Grüneberg, German footballer
- 1992 – Olivia Olson, American singer and actress
- 1993 – Grete Gaim, Estonian biathlete
- 1993 – Luke Garbutt, English footballer
- 1993 – Matías Kranevitter, Argentine footballer
- 1993 – Lynn Williams, American soccer player
- 1994 – Tom Daley, English diver
- 1995 – Diego Loyzaga, Filipino actor
- 1996 – Josh Allen, American football player
- 1996 – Indy de Vroome, Dutch tennis player
- 1996 – Karen Khachanov, Russian tennis player
- 1997 – Ivan De Santis, Italian footballer
- 1997 – Sisca Folkertsma, Dutch footballer
- 1997 – Viktoria Petryk, Ukrainian singer-songwriter
- 1997 – Kevin Quinn, American actor and singer
- 2002 – Elena Huelva, Spanish cancer activist and influencer (died 2023)
- 2007 – El Ma, Bulgarian singer-songwriter

== Deaths ==
=== Pre-1600 ===
- 252 – Sun Quan, Chinese emperor of Eastern Wu (born 182)
- 954 – Feng Dao, Chinese prince and chancellor (born 882)
- 987 – Louis V, king of West Francia (born c. 966)
- 1075 – Richeza of Poland, queen of Hungary (born 1013)
- 1086 – Wang Anshi, Chinese statesman and poet (born 1021)
- 1237 – Olaf the Black, Manx son of Godred II Olafsson
- 1254 – Conrad IV, king of Germany (born 1228)
- 1416 – Anna of Celje, queen consort of Poland (born 1386)
- 1471 – Henry VI, king of England (born 1421)
- 1481 – Christian I, king of Denmark (born 1426)
- 1512 – Pandolfo Petrucci, Italian ruler (born 1452)
- 1524 – Thomas Howard, 2nd Duke of Norfolk, English soldier and politician, Lord High Treasurer (born 1443)
- 1542 – Hernando de Soto, Spanish-American explorer (born 1496)
- 1563 – Martynas Mažvydas, Lithuanian writer (born 1510)

=== 1601–1900 ===
- 1607 – John Rainolds, English scholar and academic (born 1549)
- 1617 – Luis Fajardo, Spanish admiral and nobleman (born c. 1556)
- 1619 – Hieronymus Fabricius, Italian anatomist (born 1537)
- 1639 – Tommaso Campanella, Italian astrologer, theologian, and poet (born 1568)
- 1647 – Pieter Corneliszoon Hooft, Dutch poet and playwright (born 1581)
- 1650 – James Graham, 1st Marquess of Montrose, Scottish general and politician (born 1612)
- 1664 – Elizabeth Poole, English settler, founded Taunton, Massachusetts (born 1588)
- 1670 – Niccolò Zucchi, Italian astronomer and physicist (born 1586)
- 1686 – Otto von Guericke, German physicist and inventor of the Magdeburg Hemispheres (born 1602)
- 1690 – John Eliot, English-American minister and missionary (born 1604)
- 1719 – Pierre Poiret, French mystic and philosopher (born 1646)
- 1724 – Robert Harley, 1st Earl of Oxford and Earl Mortimer, English politician, Chancellor of the Exchequer (born 1661)
- 1742 – Lars Roberg, Swedish physician and academic (born 1664)
- 1762 – Alexander Joseph Sulkowski, Polish and Saxon general (born 1695)
- 1771 – Christopher Smart, English actor, playwright, and poet (born 1722)
- 1786 – Carl Wilhelm Scheele, German-Swedish chemist and pharmacist (born 1742)
- 1790 – Thomas Warton, English poet and critic (born 1728)
- 1810 – Chevalier d'Eon, French diplomat and spy (born 1728)
- 1829 – Sikandar Jah, 3rd Nizam (born 1768)
- 1844 – Giuseppe Baini, Italian priest and composer (born 1775)
- 1858 – José de la Riva Agüero, Peruvian soldier and politician, 1st President of Peru and 2nd President of North Peru (born 1783)
- 1862 – John Drew, Irish-American actor and manager (born 1827)
- 1879 – Arturo Prat, Chilean lawyer and commander (born 1848)
- 1894 – Émile Henry, French anarchist (born 1872)
- 1894 – August Kundt, German physicist and academic (born 1839)
- 1895 – Franz von Suppé, Austrian composer and conductor (born 1819)

=== 1901–present ===
- 1901 – Joseph Olivier, French rugby player (born 1874)
- 1911 – Williamina Fleming, Scottish-American astronomer and academic (born 1857)
- 1915 – Leonid Gobyato, Russian general and engineer (born 1875)
- 1919 – Evgraf Fedorov, Russian mathematician, crystallographer, and mineralogist (born 1853)
- 1920 – Venustiano Carranza, Mexican politician, 54th President of Mexico (born 1859)
- 1925 – Hidesaburō Ueno, Japanese agriculturalist, guardian of Hachikō (born 1871)
- 1926 – Ronald Firbank, English-Italian author (born 1886)
- 1929 – Archibald Primrose, 5th Earl of Rosebery, English politician, Prime Minister of the United Kingdom (born 1847)
- 1932 – Marcel Boulenger, French fencer and author (born 1873)
- 1935 – Jane Addams, American activist and author, co-founded Hull House, Nobel Prize laureate (born 1860)
- 1935 – Hugo de Vries, Dutch botanist and geneticist (born 1848)
- 1940 – Billy Minter, English footballer and manager (born 1888)
- 1949 – Klaus Mann, German-American novelist, playwright, and critic (born 1906)
- 1952 – John Garfield, American actor (born 1913)
- 1956 – Harry Bensley, English businessman and adventurer (born 1877)
- 1957 – Alexander Vertinsky, Ukrainian-Russian singer-songwriter, actor, and poet (born 1889)
- 1964 – James Franck, German physicist and academic, Nobel Prize laureate (born 1882)
- 1965 – Marguerite Bise, French chef (born 1898)
- 1965 – Geoffrey de Havilland, English pilot and engineer, designed the de Havilland Mosquito (born 1882)
- 1968 – Doris Lloyd, English actress (born 1896)
- 1970 – E. L. Grant Watson, English-Australian biologist and author (born 1885)
- 1973 – Vaughn Monroe, American singer, trumpet player, bandleader, and actor (born 1911)
- 1973 – Ivan Konev, Soviet Marshal and general (born 1897)
- 1981 – Raymond McCreesh, PIRA volunteer, died on hunger strike (born 1957)
- 1981 – Patsy O'Hara, INLA volunteer, died on hunger strike (born 1957)
- 1983 – Kenneth Clark, English historian and author (born 1903)
- 1984 – Ann Little, American actress (born 1891)
- 1988 – Sammy Davis Sr., American actor and dancer (born 1900)
- 1991 – Rajiv Gandhi, Indian politician, 6th Prime Minister of India (born 1944)
- 1995 – Les Aspin, American captain and politician, 18th United States Secretary of Defense (born 1938)
- 1996 – Paul Delph, American singer-songwriter and producer (born 1957)
- 1996 – Lash LaRue, American actor and producer (born 1917)
- 1996 – Villem Raam, Estonian art historian, art critic and conservator (born 1910)
- 1998 – Robert Gist, American actor and director (born 1917)
- 2000 – Barbara Cartland, English author (born 1901)
- 2000 – John Gielgud, English actor (born 1904)
- 2000 – Mark R. Hughes, American businessman, founded Herbalife (born 1956)
- 2002 – Niki de Saint Phalle, French-American sculptor and painter (born 1930)
- 2003 – Alejandro de Tomaso, Argentinian-Italian race car driver and businessman, founded De Tomaso (born 1928)
- 2003 – Frank D. White, American captain, banker, and politician, 41st Governor of Arkansas (born 1933)
- 2005 – Deborah Berger, American outsider artist (born 1956)
- 2005 – Stephen Elliott, American actor (born 1918)
- 2005 – Howard Morris, American actor and director (born 1919)
- 2006 – Spencer Clark, American race car driver (born 1987)
- 2006 – Katherine Dunham, American dancer, choreographer, and author (born 1909)
- 2006 – Cherd Songsri, Thai director, producer, and screenwriter (born 1931)
- 2006 – Billy Walker, American singer-songwriter and guitarist (born 1929)
- 2012 – Eddie Blazonczyk, American singer-songwriter (born 1941)
- 2012 – Otis Clark, American butler and preacher, survivor of the Tulsa race massacre (born 1903)
- 2012 – Constantine of Irinoupolis, Metropolitan of Irinoupolis and Primate of the Ukrainian Orthodox Church of the USA (born 1936)
- 2012 – Roman Dumbadze, Georgian commander (born 1964)
- 2012 – Douglas Rodríguez, Cuban boxer (born 1950)
- 2012 – Bill Stewart, American football player and coach (born 1952)
- 2012 – Alan Thorne, Australian anthropologist and academic (born 1939)
- 2013 – Count Christian of Rosenborg, member of the Danish royal family (born 1942)
- 2013 – Frank Comstock, American trombonist, composer, and conductor (born 1922)
- 2013 – Cot Deal, American baseball player and coach (born 1923)
- 2013 – Leonard Marsh, American businessman, co-founded Snapple (born 1933)
- 2013 – Bob Thompson, American pianist and composer (born 1924)
- 2013 – Dominique Venner, French journalist and historian (born 1935)
- 2014 – Tunku Annuar, Malaysian son of Badlishah of Kedah (born 1939)
- 2014 – Johnny Gray, American baseball player (born 1926)
- 2014 – Jaime Lusinchi, Venezuelan physician and politician, President of Venezuela (born 1924)
- 2014 – Alireza Soleimani, Iranian wrestler (born 1956)
- 2015 – Annarita Sidoti, Italian race walker (born 1969)
- 2015 – Twinkle, English singer-songwriter (born 1948)
- 2015 – Jassem Al-Kharafi, Kuwaiti businessman and politician, 8th Kuwaiti Speaker of the National Assembly (born 1940)
- 2015 – Fred Gladding, American baseball player and coach (born 1936)
- 2015 – Louis Johnson, American bass player and producer (born 1955)
- 2016 – Nick Menza, American drummer and songwriter (born 1964)
- 2019 – Rik Kuypers, Belgian film director (born 1925)
- 2019 – Binyavanga Wainaina, Kenyan writer (born 1971)
- 2020 – Alan Merten, fifth President of George Mason University (born 1941)
- 2024 – Jan A. P. Kaczmarek, Polish composer (born 1953)
- 2025 – Gerry Connolly, American politician, U.S. Representative from Virginia's 11th congressional district (born 1950)
- 2026 – Kyle Busch, American race car driver and owner (born 1985)

== Holidays and observances ==
- Afro-Colombian Day (Colombia)
- Christian feast day:
  - Blessed Adílio Daronch and Manuel Gómez González
  - Blessed Franz Jägerstätter
  - Earliest day on which Corpus Christi can fall, while June 24 is the latest; held on Thursday after Trinity Sunday (often locally moved to Sunday). (Roman Catholic Church)
  - Eugène de Mazenod
  - Helena of Constantinople, also known as "Feast of the Holy Great Sovereigns Constantine and Helen, Equal-to-the-Apostles." (Eastern Orthodox Church, Anglican Communion)
  - Blessed Hemming of Turku
  - John Elliot (Episcopal Church)
  - Saints of the Cristero War, including Christopher Magallanes
  - May 21 (Eastern Orthodox liturgics)
- Circassian Day of Mourning (Circassians)
- Day of Patriots and Military (Hungary)
- Independence Day, celebrates the Montenegrin independence referendum in 2006, celebrated until the next day. (Montenegro)
- International Tea Day (International)
- Navy Day (Chile)
- Saint Helena Day, celebrates the discovery of Saint Helena in 1502. (Saint Helena, Ascension and Tristan da Cunha)
- World Day for Cultural Diversity for Dialogue and Development (International)
