= Chvostek =

Chvostek may refer to:

- Chvostek sign, a clinical sign of existing nerve hyperexcitability
- Annabelle Chvostek (born 1973), Canadian singer-songwriter based
- František Chvostek (1835–1884), Czech-Austrian military physician
