= Circassian Day of Mourning =

Annual commemoration of Circassian genocide victims (21 May)

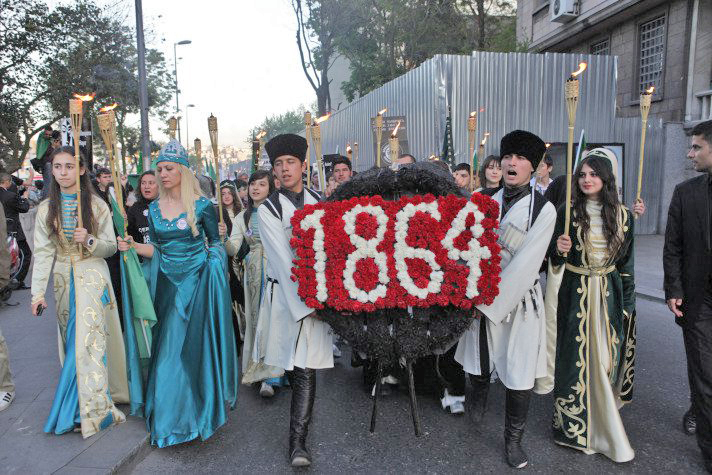
Turkish Circassians during a remembrance march in Istanbul, 21 May 2011

The Circassian Day of Mourning (Adyghe: Шъыгъо-шӏэжъ маф, Shygho-shezh maf; Russian: День памяти жертв Кавказской войны, Den pamyati zhertv Kavkazskoy voyny) is observed by the Circassian diaspora every year on 21 May to commemorate all those who were killed in and displaced by the Circassian genocide, which took place in the final stages of the Russian invasion of Circassia. It is known in Russia as the Day of Remembrance for the Victims of the Caucasus War, because the Russian government does not recognize the events as a genocide. On 21 May 1864, the Russian general Pavel Grabbe held a military parade in what is now Krasnaya Polyana following his troops' victory in the Battle of Qbaada; it was also on this day that Circassia was annexed by the Russian Empire, which then launched a campaign to empty the region of the native Circassian people.

== Background ==
From 1763 to 1864 the Circassians fought against the Russians in the Russian-Circassian War. During the war, Russian Empire employed a genocidal strategy of massacring Circassian civilians. Only a small percentage who accepted Russification and resettlement within the Russian Empire were completely spared. The remaining Circassian population who refused were variously dispersed or killed en masse. Circassian villages would be located and burnt, systematically starved, or their entire population massacred. Leo Tolstoy reports that Russian soldiers would attack village houses at night. Sir Pelgrave, a British diplomat who witnessed the events, adds that "their only crime was not being Russian."

A mass deportation was launched against the surviving population before the end of the war in 1864 and it was mostly completed by 1867. Some died from epidemics or starvation among the crowds of deportees and were reportedly eaten by dogs after their death. Others died when the ships underway sank during storms. Calculations, including taking into account the Russian government's own archival figures, have estimated a loss of 80–97% of the Circassian population in the process. The displaced people were settled primarily to the Ottoman Empire.

In 1914, Nicholas II celebrated the 50th anniversary of the defeat of the Circassians, describing it as one of the empire's greatest victories. Boris Yeltsin acknowledged in 1996 when signing a peace treaty with Chechnya during the First Chechen War that the war was a tragedy whose responsibility lies with Russia.

== Holiday ==
In 1990, the Circassians designated 21 May as the Day of Mourning for their people, on which they commemorate the tragedy of the nation. It is memorable and non-working day in the three republics of the Russian Federation (Adygea, Kabardino-Balkaria and Karachay-Cherkessia) as well as In the Circassian villages of the Krasnodar Krai. The government of the partially recognized Republic of Abkhazia also mourns the day of mourning on May 21 (until 2011, it was mourned on May 31).

The day is also widely mourned with rallies and processions in countries with a large Circassian diaspora, such as Turkey, Jordan, Germany, United States, and other countries of the Middle East.

In 2017, the Circassian national movement experienced a national upsurge, and the readiness of Circassians to defend their own identity increased. On May 21, 2017, tens of thousands of Circassians in Adygea, Kabardino-Balkaria and Karachay-Cherkessia took part in mourning events dedicated to the anniversary of the end of the Russian-Caucasian War. The multi-million diaspora of Circassians abroad was not left aside, for example, there was a mass procession with national banners of Circassia through the central streets of Turkish cities. For the first time in the history of post-war Circassia, which today exists only in the historical memory of Circassians, commemorative events dedicated to the victims of the Russian-Caucasian war were held in schools, higher educational institutions, and in cities with a compact population of Circassians.

On 21st May 2025, Syrian Circassians publicly marked the Day of Mourning in Syria for the first time, with a vigil in Umayyad Square, Damascus. Commemoration of the genocide had been banned under the Baathist regime due to its alliance with the Soviet Union and the Russian Federation.

== Persecution of Circassian activists ==
In May 2014, on the eve of the tragic date (May 21), Beslan Teuvazhev, one of the organizers of a campaign to make commemorative ribbons for the 150th anniversary of the Russian-Caucasian War, was detained by Moscow police officers. More than 70 thousand ribbons were seized from him. Later Teuvazhev was released, but the ribbons were not returned, having found signs of extremism in the inscriptions printed on them. Circassian activists call such an act "a continuation of the policy of oppression of national minorities" of the times of the empire.

In spring 2017, a court in the Lazarevsky district of Krasnodar Krai sentenced seventy-year-old Circassian activist Ruslan Gvashev for his participation in the May 21, 2017 mourning events dedicated to the memory of the victims of the Russian-Caucasian War. Ruslan Gvashev is a well-known Circassian activist in the region, head of the Shapsug Khase, chairman of the Congress of Adyg-Shapsugs of the Black Sea region, vice-president of the Confederation of Peoples of the Caucasus and the International Circassian Association. Nevertheless, the court found the defendant guilty of organizing an unauthorized rally and imposed a fine of 10,000 rubles on Ruslan Gvashev. Due to the disability of the accused (Ruslan Gvashev has one leg amputated), the court released him directly from the courtroom. The Circassian activist, who does not agree with the offensive, in his opinion, charge, sought help from the Kabardino-Balkarian Human Rights Center in order to obtain a review of his case and recognition of the Circassians' right to hold memorial events.

Since the beginning of 2022, the authorities have been working systematically to cancel Circassian (Adyghe) commemorative and festive events. They banned the celebration of the Circassian flag day, and later banned the procession that had become traditional in honor of the mourning day of May 21.

== See also ==
- Circassians
- Circassian nationalism
- Circassian genocide
- Circassian diaspora
