= Adalbert Duchek =

Czech internist and pathologist

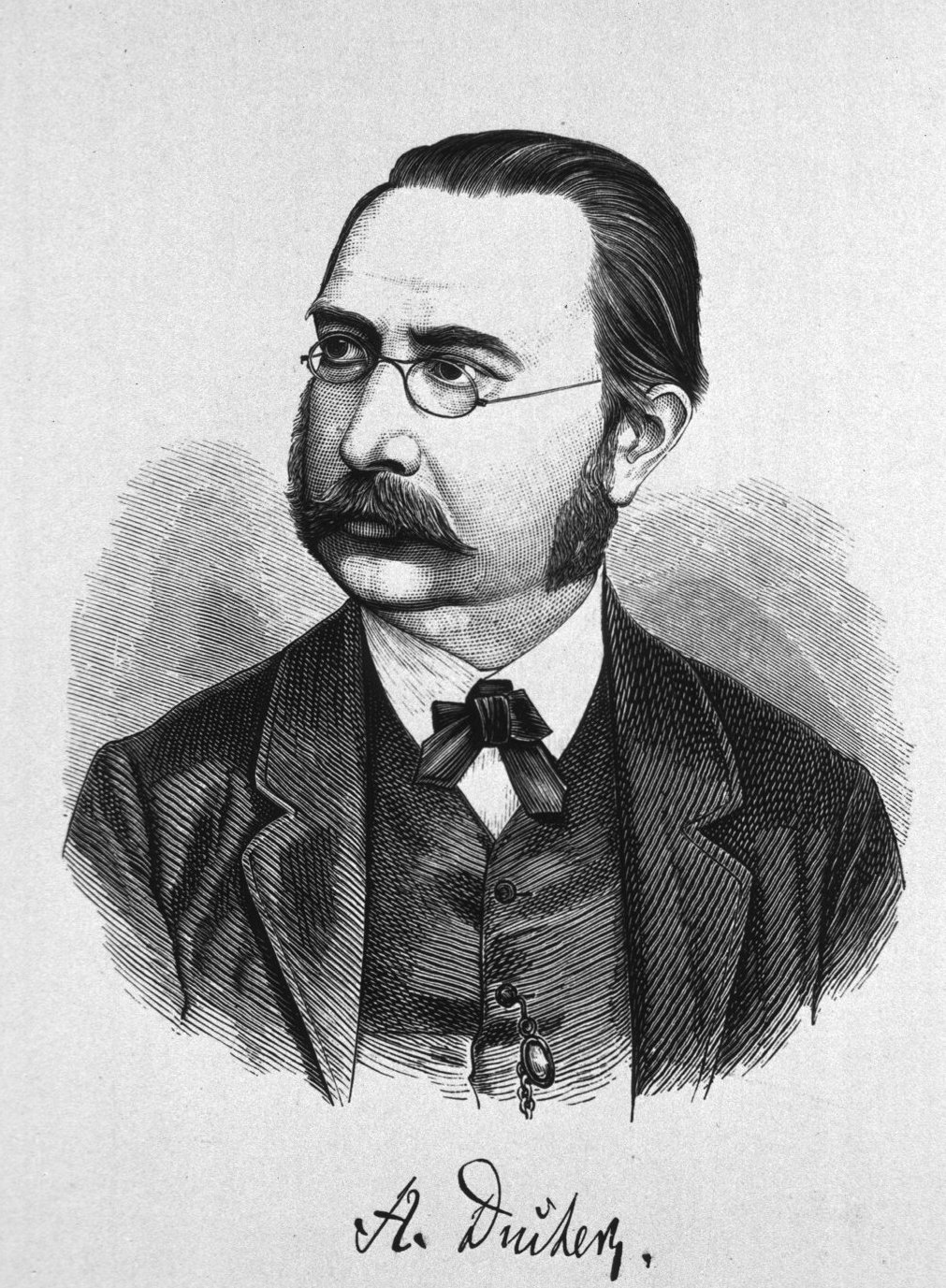
Adalbert Duchek

Adalbert Duchek (Czech: Vojtěch Duchek; 1 December 1824 – 2 March 1882) was an internist and pathologist in Austria-Hungary who was a native of Prague.

In 1848 he received his medical doctorate at Prague, later becoming a professor at the medical-surgical school in Lemberg (1855). Shortly afterwards he served as a professor at the University of Heidelberg (1856–58), and in 1858 became a professor at Josephs Academy in Vienna. In 1871 he replaced Josef Škoda (1805–1881) at the medical faculty in Vienna. After Duchek's death in 1882, his position at Vienna was filled by Carl Nothnagel (1841–1905).

Duchek was considered an excellent teacher and diagnostician, remembered for his investigations of scurvy. In Vienna he was editor of medical yearbooks (1861–70) and of the weekly magazine issued by the K.K. Gesellschaft der Ärzte zu Wien (Royal Society of Physicians at Vienna).

== Selected publications ==
- Die Krankheiten der Kreislaufs-, Athmungs-, Verdauungs-, der Geschlechts- und Harnorgane, (The diseases of the circulatory, respiratory, digestive, sexual and urinary organs) (in Handbook of special pathology and therapy, Volume I, Erlangen 1862)
- Scorbut (Scurvy); in Pitha-Billroth's "Handbuch der allgemeinen und speciellen Chirurgie" I, 2. Abt. A, Erlangen 1876).
