= Philipp Grüneberg =

German footballer (born 1992)

Personal information
- Full name: Philipp Grüneberg
- Date of birth: 21 May 1992 (age 34)
- Place of birth: Berlin, Germany
- Height: 1.78 m (5 ft 10 in)
- Position: Forward

Team information
- Current team: SV Lichtenberg 47
- Number: 19

Youth career
- –2011: 1. FC Union Berlin

Senior career*
| Years | Team | Apps | (Gls) |
| 2011–2012 | Carl Zeiss Jena II | 9 | (9) |
| 2011–2012 | Carl Zeiss Jena | 7 | (0) |
| 2012 | FSV Zwickau | 0 | (0) |
| 2012–2014 | Union Berlin II | 10 | (2) |
| 2014 | FSV Optik Rathenow | 12 | (2) |
| 2014– | SV Lichtenberg 47 | 108 | (67) |
- * Club domestic league appearances and goals as of 1 August 2020

Philipp Grüneberg (born 21 May 1992 in Berlin) is a German footballer who plays as a forward for SV Lichtenberg 47.
