= NART TV =

Jordanian broadcast television channel

NART TV (National Adighe Radio and Television) is a Circassian television channel broadcast from Jordan. Established in 2007, the channel's programs cover topics related to Circassian history and culture around the world.
