= František Chvostek =

Czech-Austrian military physician

František Chvostek (German: Franz Chvostek; /ˈkvɒstɪk/; 21 May 1835 – 16 November 1884) was a Czech-Austrian military medical doctor and lecturer in internal medicine. He published articles on a wide variety of medical disorders but is most notable for having described Chvostek's sign which he described in 1876.

== Biography ==
Chvostek was born in Místek, Moravia, to a leather tanner. He joined the army as a military surgeon and studied at the Josephinian Military Academy of Surgery in Vienna, receiving his doctorate in 1863 and becoming a regimental physician and surgeon at Vienna's Garrison Hospital. From 1863 to 1867 he was the assistant of Adalbert Duchek (1824–1882) and from 1868 to 1871 he lectured on electrotherapy at the Josephinian Academy. In 1871 he took over Duchek's medical clinic, which he led until the academy's closure in 1874. He then returned to the Garrison Hospital's department of internal medicine, where he remained until his death in 1884.

== Contributions to medicine ==
Chvostek published at least 163 journal articles before his death at age 49, focusing on a broad range of topics including neuronal excitability, electrotherapy, Grave's disease, syphilis, and tuberculosis. He published a paper in the Vienna Medical Press in 1876 describing what would become to be known as Chvostek's sign: muscular spasm in the face when the facial nerve is tapped in people with latent tetany. Chvostek's only son, Franz Chvostek, wrote numerous papers about the sign and was among the first to associate it with hypoparathyroidism in an article published in 1907.
