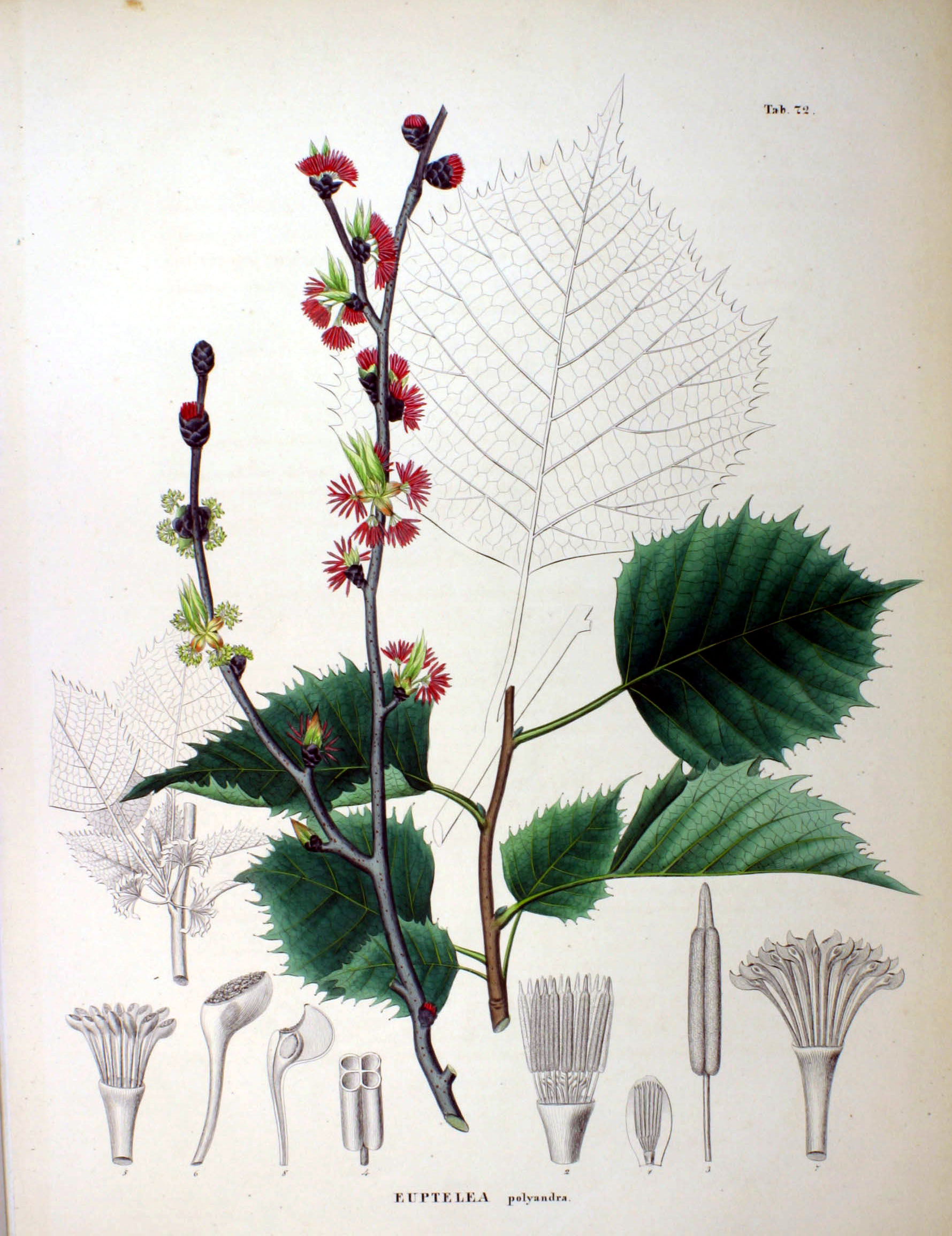
- Euptelea polyandra

Scientific classification
- Kingdom: Plantae
- Clade: Tracheophytes
- Clade: Angiosperms
- Clade: Eudicots
- Order: Ranunculales
- Family: Eupteleaceae; K.Wilh.
- Genus: Euptelea; Siebold & Zucc.

Species
- Euptelea pleiosperma; Euptelea polyandra

= Euptelea =

Euptelea Temporal range: Paleocene–Recent

Genus of flowering plants

Euptelea is a genus of two species of flowering plants in the monogeneric family Eupteleaceae. The genus is found from Assam east through China to Japan, and consists of shrubs or small trees:

- Euptelea pleiosperma
- Euptelea polyandra

The genus was previously placed in the family Trochodendraceae, but the family Eupteleaceae has been recognized by many taxonomists. The APG IV system (2016; unchanged from the APG III system of 2009, the APG II system of 2003 and the APG system of 1998), recognizes it and places it in the order Ranunculales, in the clade eudicots. The family consists of a single genus Euptelea, with two species, native to eastern Asia.

== Usage ==
Euptelea polyandra is used as a food plant by the larvae of some Lepidoptera species including the engrailed.

== Appearance ==
The flowers lack sepals and petals. The anthers are basifixed, and the leaves are arranged in whorls.

== Fossil history ==
The fossil range of the genus extends back to the Paleocene epoch, during much of the Cenozoic it was distributed widely over the Northern Hemisphere.
