= Coffee production in Guam =

Coffee production in Guam is limited to local consumption. Like cacao, coffee has been introduced to and thrives in Guam. In the early 20th century, coffee was described as one Guam's most common plants, growing about most of the dwelling houses, and nearly every family has its cultivated patch. The climate and soil of the island is well adapted to it, producing the crop from sea level to the hill tops.

== History ==
Cox (1917) noted that coffee received little care in Guam, and grew in various situations and in almost any soil. Most of the houses of a village were surrounded by coffee bushes, and the fresh seeds sprouted spontaneously beneath the parent plant or if thrown upon soil in a shady place. There were no large plantations on the island, each family planting enough only for its own consumption. The berries were gathered, pulped, and hulled by hand. Coffee grown here is coffea arabica which is locally known as Kafe in Guam, and is of very fine quality, just adequate for local consumption with no surplus for export. Enough coffee is not produced in Guam for exportation; indeed, there is scarcely enough for the use of the local population.

=== Production in the early 20th century ===
Safford (1905) noted that coffee seeds in Guam were planted at a depth of about 4 centimetres (1.6 in) in beds. Seeds were planted in sementeras (nurseries) about 8 centimetres (3.1 in) apart, in rows. The plants, easily transplanted, require minimal watering. The best time for transplanting is at the beginning of the rainy season. The plants are shaded at first by sections of coconut leaves stuck in the ground in a slanting direction. Sometimes, the young plants are shaded by alternating rows of bananas. These are cut down when the coffee plants are well established. Catch crops of taro or maize may also be planted for the first two years. Weeding is accomplished by the fosifio (thrust-hoe). The plants are kept free from shoots or suckers sprouting out from their stems, which are removed when young. Although coffee disease is rare, the berries are sometimes eaten by rats, which infest the island. The berries are gathered as soon as they are ripe. Pulping is done by hand, and the mucilaginous material surrounding the seeds is removed by washing, after which the coffee is spread out to dry in the sun. The coffee is thoroughly dried before removing the hull. The chaff is removed by winnowing. In preparing it, the beans are roasted and ground on a stone metate with a cylindrical mano, like a "tapering rolling~pin of stone".

== Present prospects ==
In the 1970s there were only 200 coffee trees planted in Piti village in the Masso region that were growing, but due to a fire hardly any trees survived. In the same area, of the 240 trees planted in 1978, a few trees were reported to be sprouting. Some of these plants were used in a nursery of the Department of Agriculture to plant them in more areas. Tita Taitague, Director of the Department of Agriculture who had visited the nursery in 2012 is hopeful of the survival of this local coffee variety.

== See also ==
- List of countries by coffee production

== Bibliography ==
- Cox, Leonard Martin; Dorn, Edward John; McIntosh, Kenneth Chafee (1917). The island of Guam. Merlyn Grail Cook, Mrs. Allen H. White, United States. Navy Dept (Public domain ed.). Government Printing Office. p. 14.
- Safford, William Edwin (1905). Contributions from the United States National Herbarium. United States National Herbarium, United States. Dept. of Agriculture, United States National Museum (Public domain ed.). U.S. Government Printing Office.
