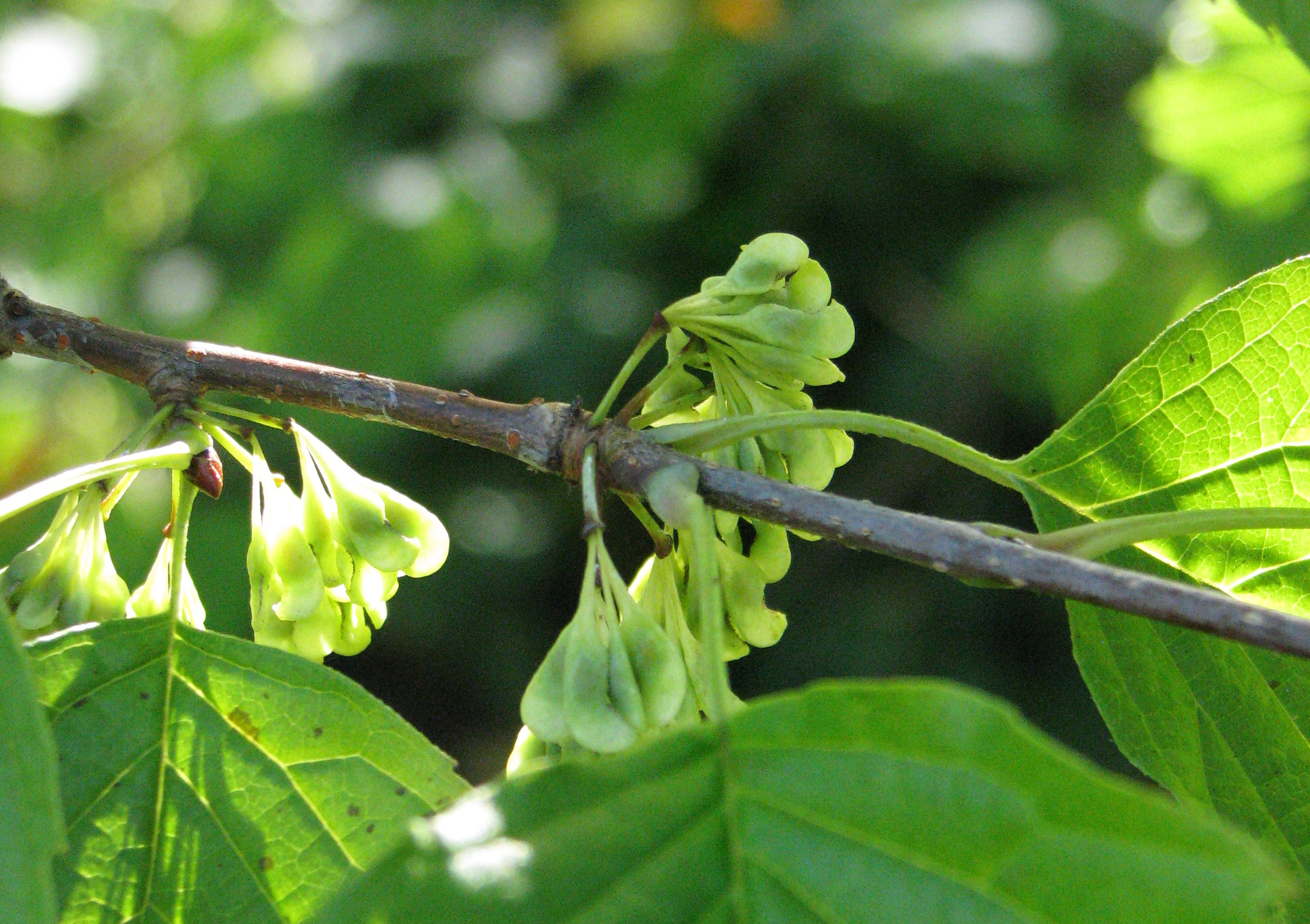

Conservation status
- Least Concern (IUCN 2.3)

Scientific classification
- Kingdom: Plantae
- Clade: Tracheophytes
- Clade: Angiosperms
- Clade: Eudicots
- Order: Ranunculales
- Family: Eupteleaceae
- Genus: Euptelea
- Species: E. pleiosperma

Binomial name
- Euptelea pleiosperma Hook.f. & Thomson

Synonyms
- Euptelea davidiana Baillon; Euptelea delavayi Tieghem; Euptelea franchetii Tieghem; Euptelea minor Ching

= Euptelea pleiosperma =

Species of flowering plant

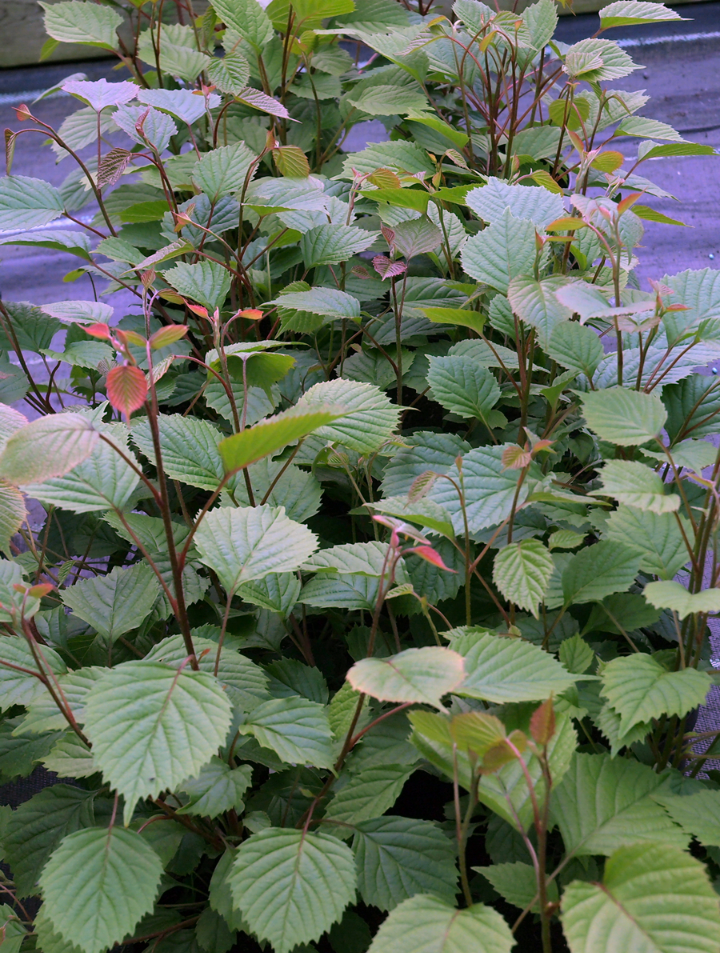
Euptelea pleiosperma

Euptelea pleiosperma is a species of flowering plant in the family Eupteleaceae. It is found in China, India, and Myanmar.
