= Circumdatin H =

Names
- Preferred IUPAC name (5bS)-2-Methoxy-5b,6,7,8-tetrahydro-10H,16H-pyrrolo[2,1-c]quinazolino[3,2-a][1,4]benzodiazepine-10,16-dione

Identifiers
CAS Number	868528-39-6
3D model (JSmol)	Interactive image
ChEBI	CHEBI:65634
ChEMBL	ChEMBL2435957
ChemSpider	21431235
PubChem CID	46184995
UNII	3BS8YZ86VK
- InChI: InChI=1S/C20H17N3O3/c1-26-12-8-9-15-14(11-12)20(25)23-16-6-3-2-5-13(16)19(24)22-10-4-7-17(22)18(23)21-15/h2-3,5-6,8-9,11,17H,4,7,10H2,1H3/t17-/m0/s1 Key: MLEAYJRUKNTODR-KRWDZBQOSA-N; InChI=1/C20H17N3O3/c1-26-12-8-9-15-14(11-12)20(25)23-16-6-3-2-5-13(16)19(24)22-10-4-7-17(22)18(23)21-15/h2-3,5-6,8-9,11,17H,4,7,10H2,1H3/t17-/m0/s1 Key: MLEAYJRUKNTODR-KRWDZBQOBN
- SMILES: COc1ccc2c(c1)c(=O)n-3c(n2)[C@@H]4CCCN4C(=O)c5c3cccc5

Properties
Chemical formula	C_{20}H_{17}N_{3}O_{3}
Molar mass	347.374 g·mol^{−1}
- Except where otherwise noted, data are given for materials in their standard state (at 25 °C [77 °F], 100 kPa). Infobox references

Circumdatin H is an alkaloid. It was isolated, along with related compounds, from the fungus Aspergillus ochraceus.

Circumdatin C, and circumdatin F are prototypical members, while other members such as circumdatin D, circumdatin E and circumdatin H have an additional tetrahydropyrrole ring.

The compounds of this group are considered to be useful chemotaxonomic markers. Among these circumdatin H and circumdatin E are able to inhibit the mitochondrial respiratory chain in submitochondrial particles from beef heart, presumable by interfering with NADH oxidase activity (IC_{50} 1.5 μM and 2.5 μM, respectively).

First total synthesis of circumdatin H was reported starting from anthranilic acid.
