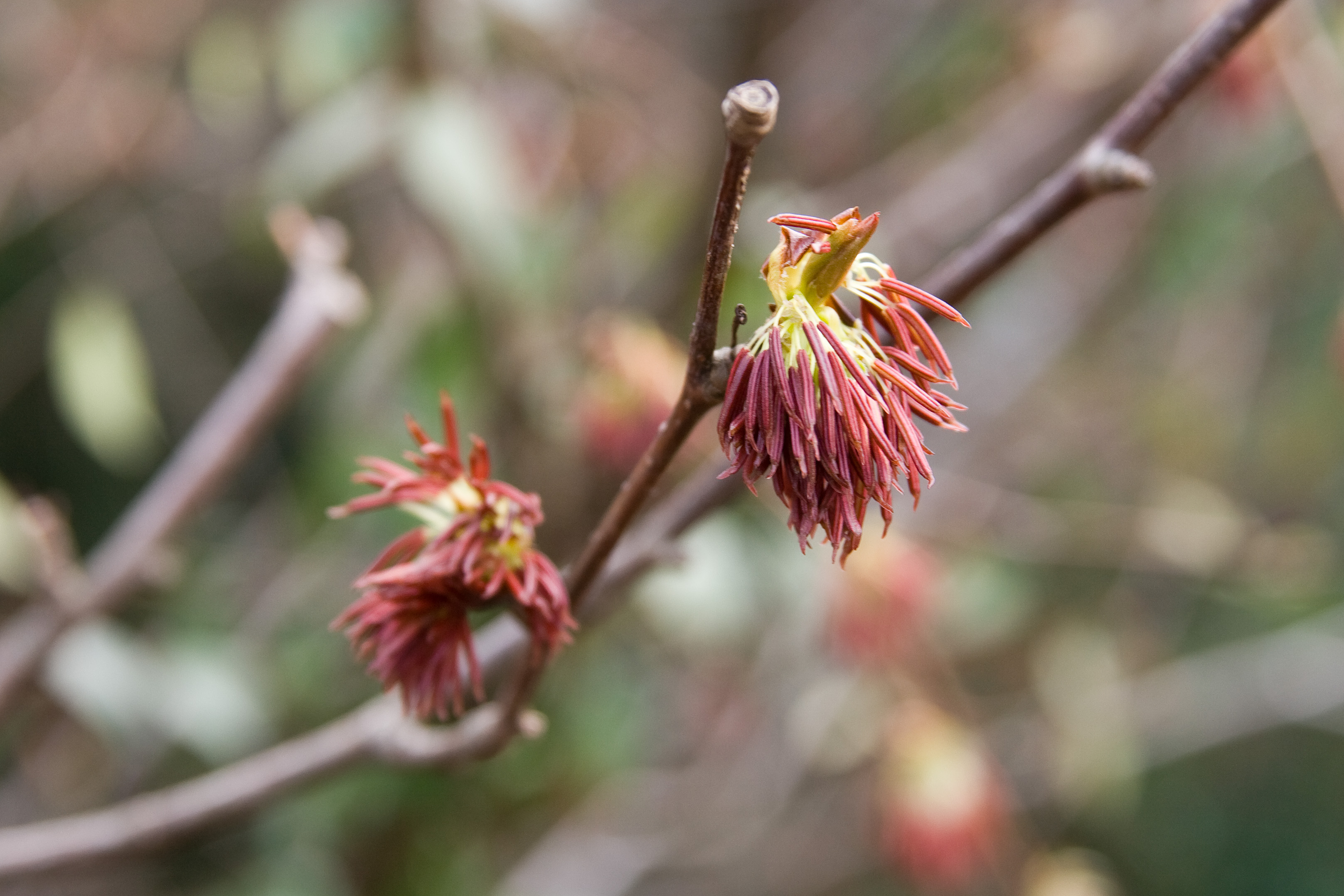
- Flowers
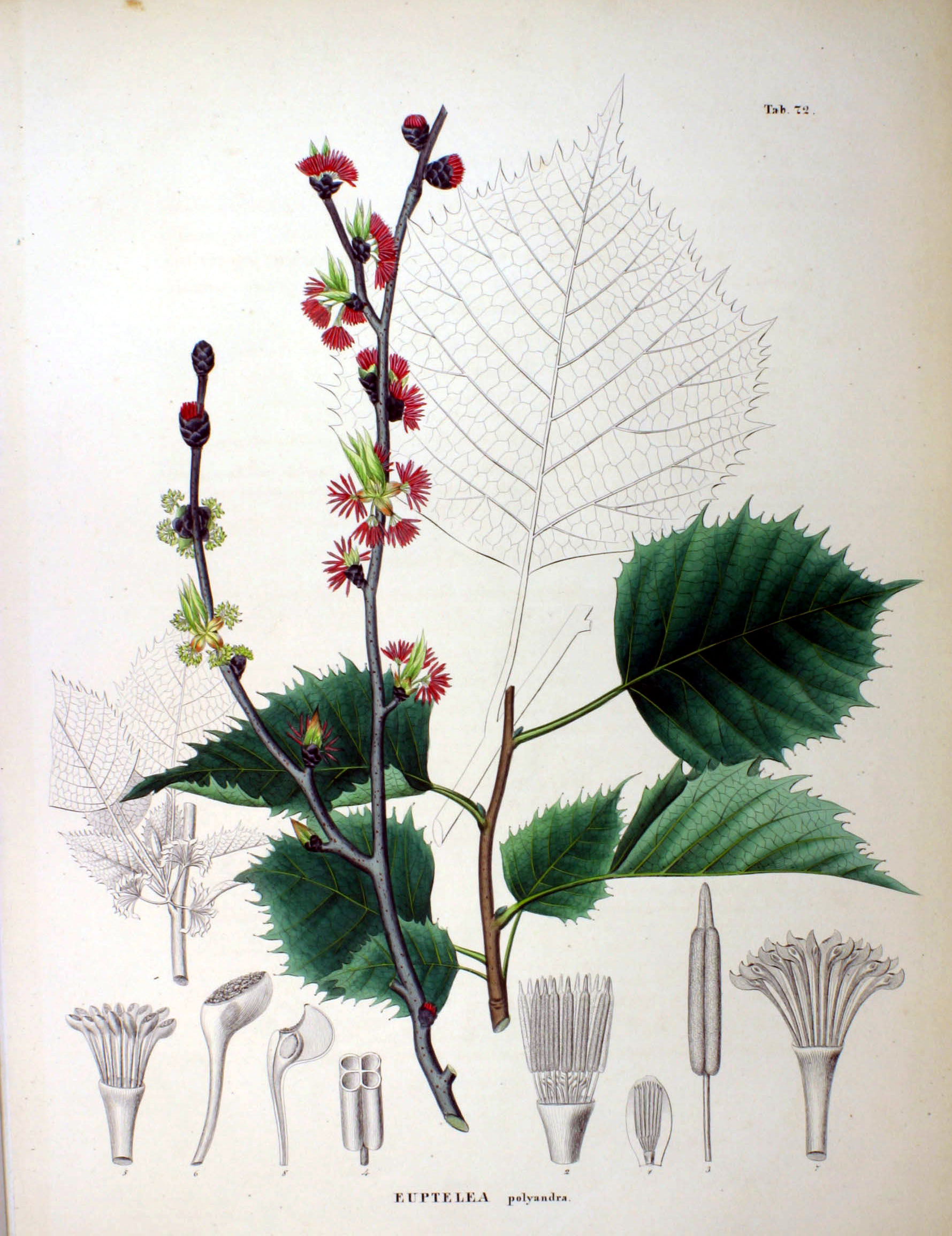
- Botanical illustration

Conservation status
- Least Concern (IUCN 3.1)

Scientific classification
- Kingdom: Plantae
- Clade: Tracheophytes
- Clade: Angiosperms
- Clade: Eudicots
- Order: Ranunculales
- Family: Eupteleaceae
- Genus: Euptelea
- Species: E. polyandra

Binomial name
- Euptelea polyandra Siebold & Zucc.

Synonyms
- Euptelea polyandra f. hypoleuca M.Mizush. & Yokouchi

= Euptelea polyandra =

Species of plant

Euptelea polyandra is a species of flowering plant in the family Eupteleaceae, native to wet areas of central and southern Japan. A suckering small tree, occasionally a many-stemmed shrub, it is used as a street tree in a number of European cities.

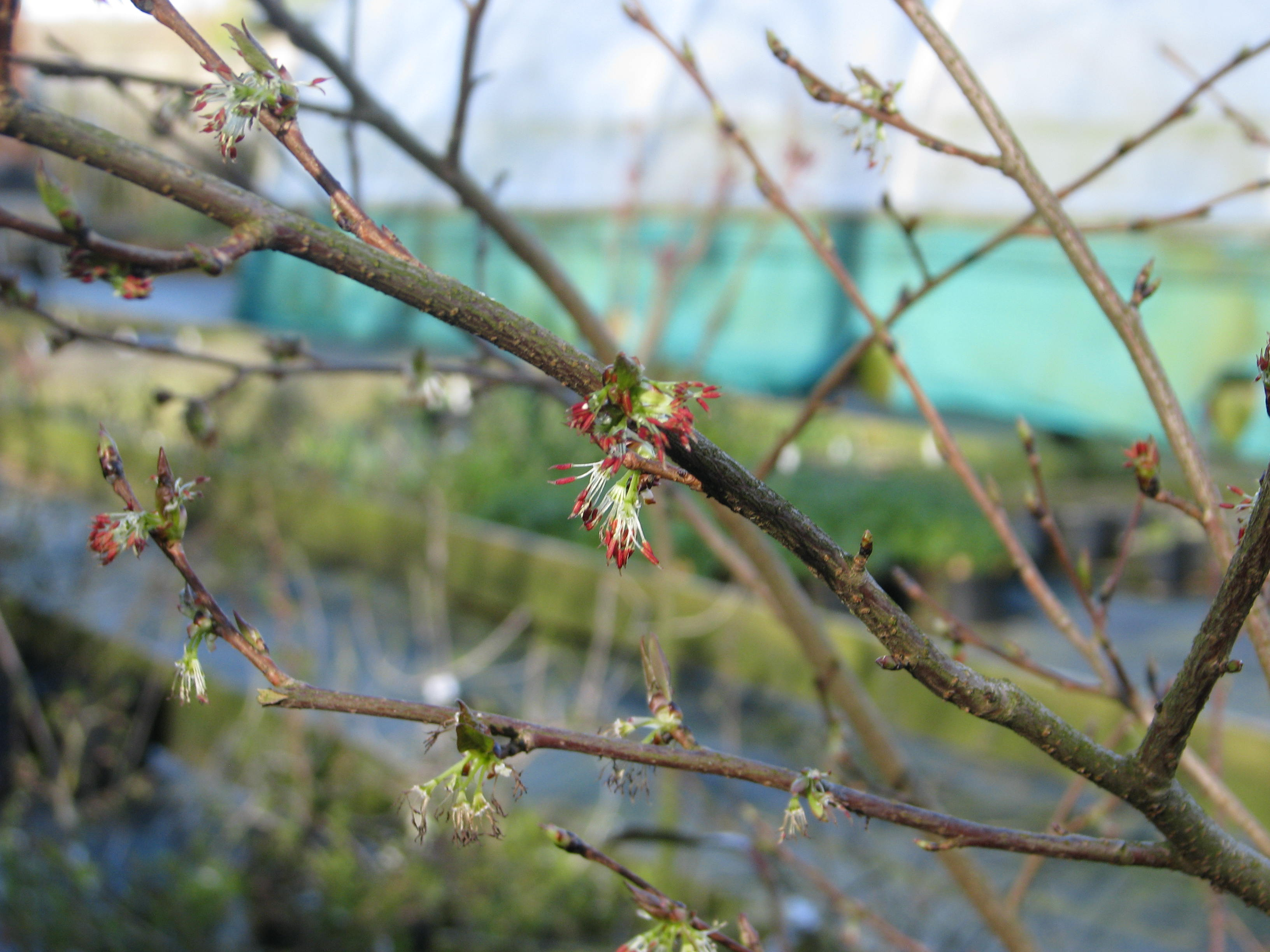
Flowers and stems

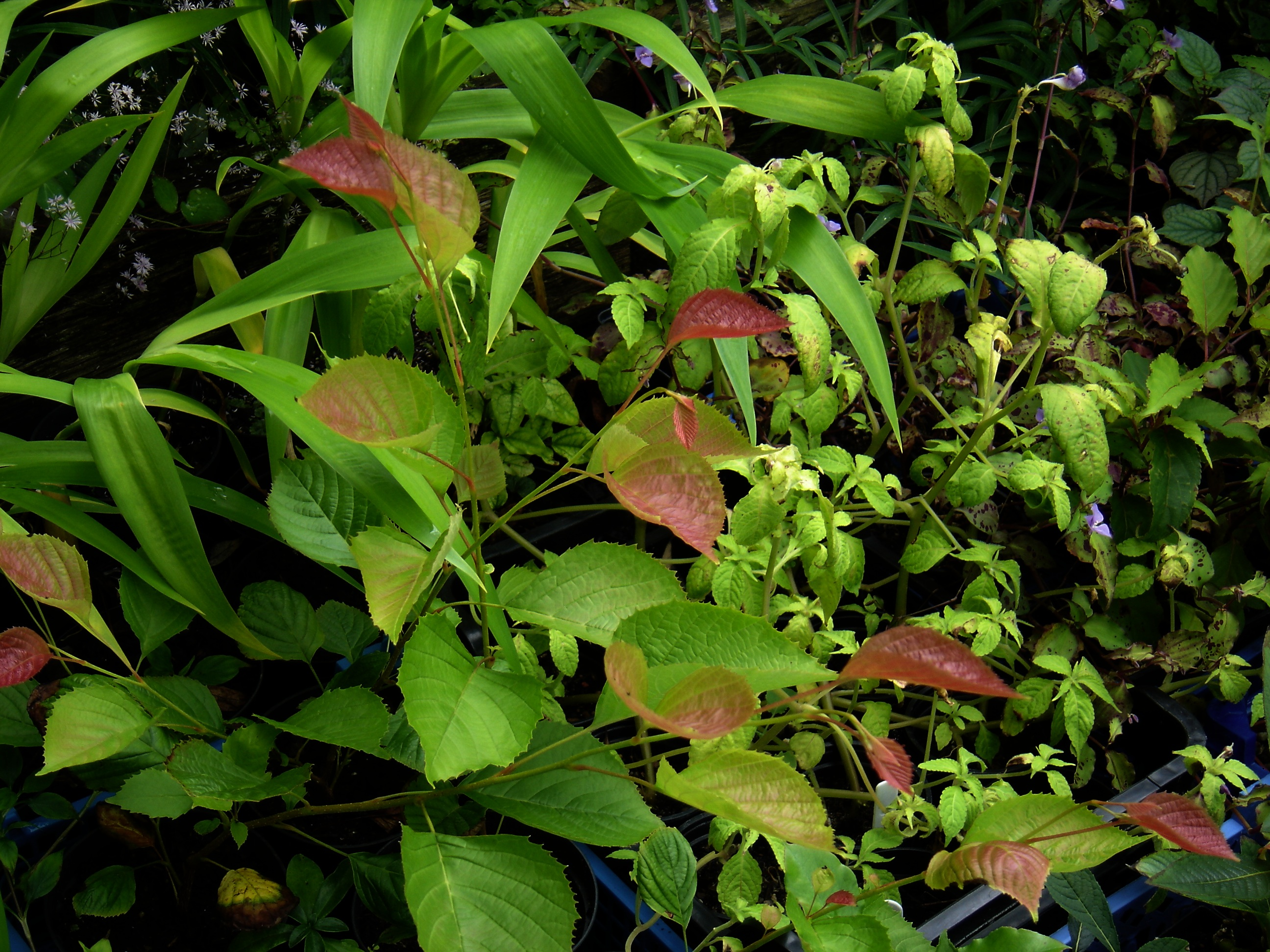
Young leaves

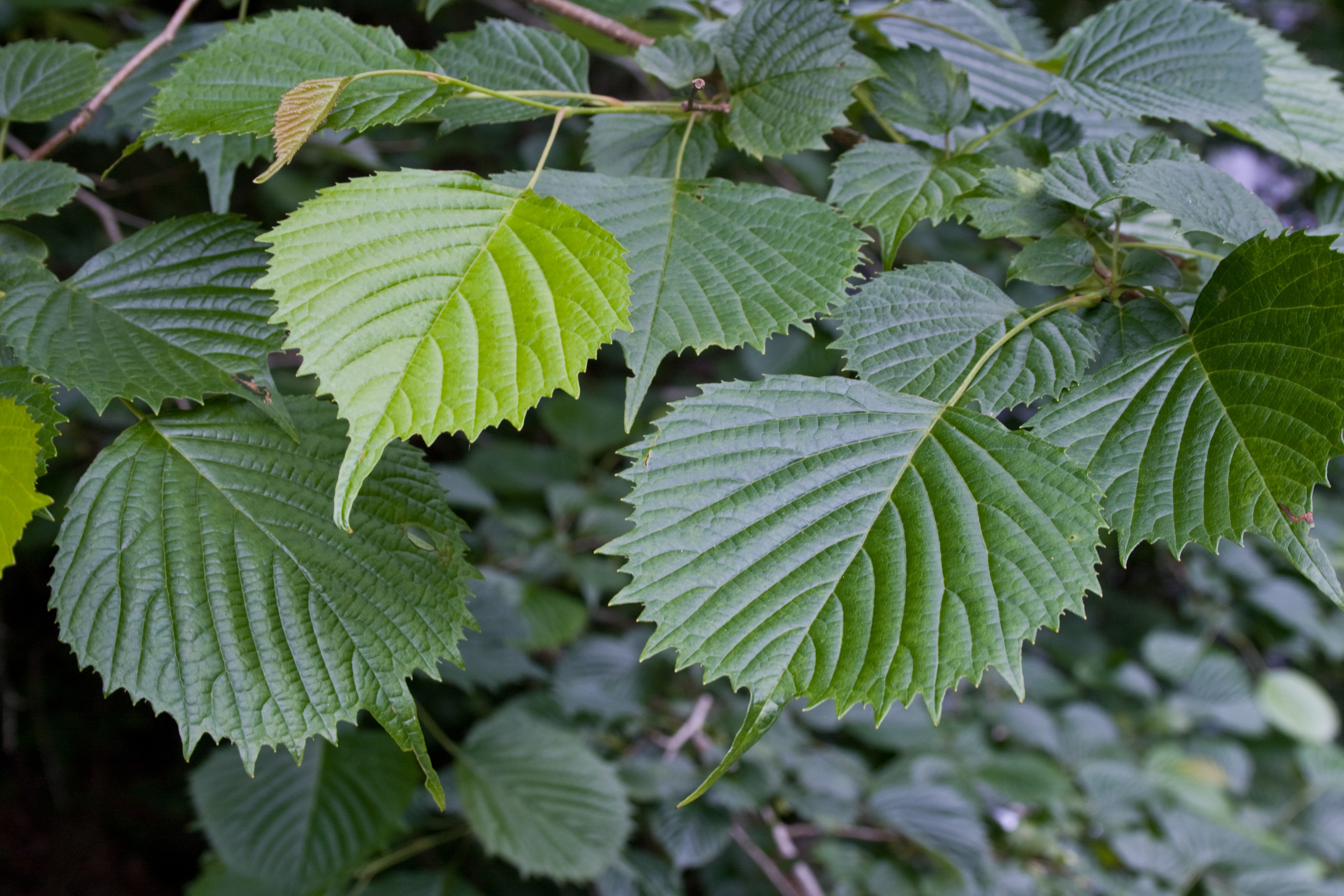
Leaves

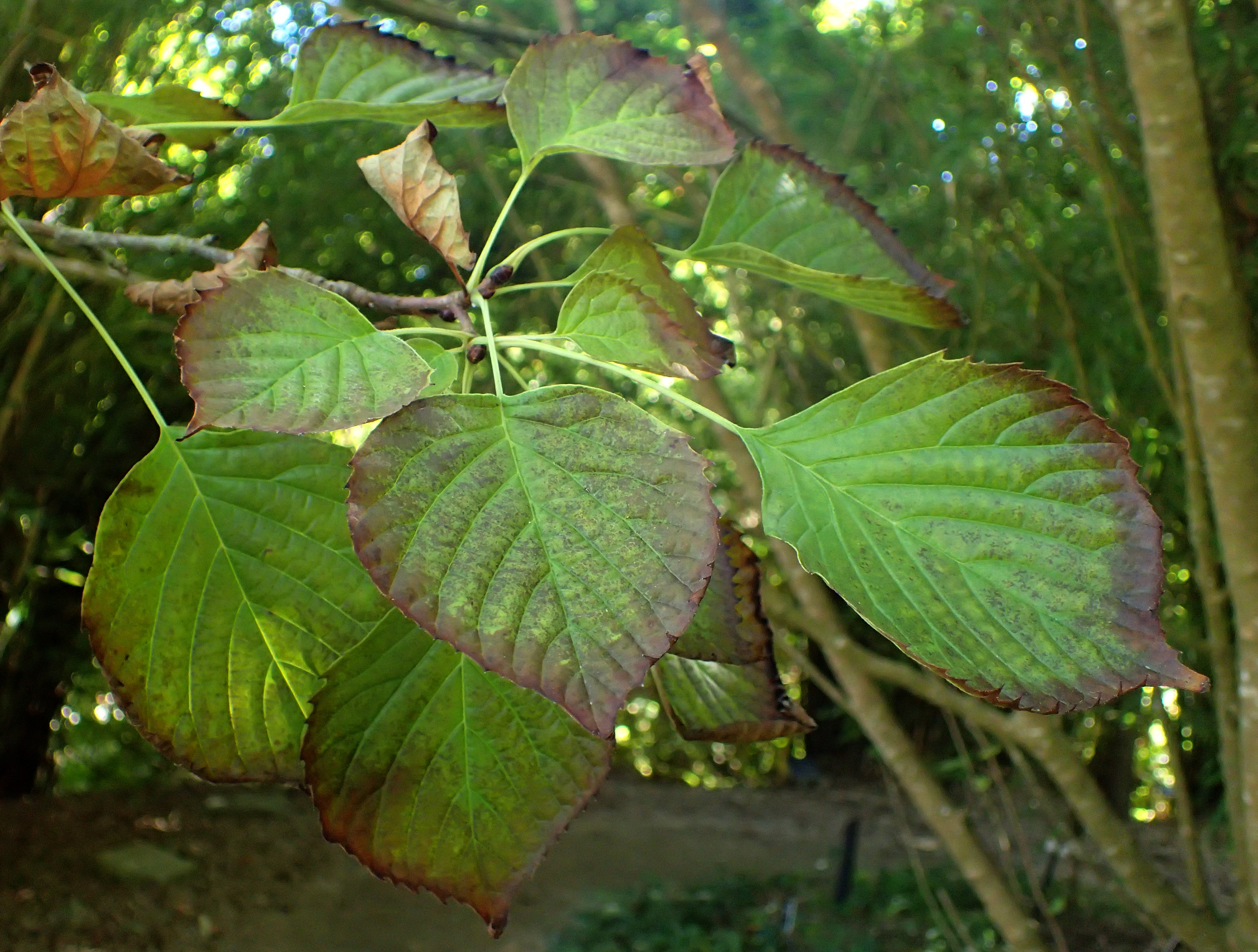
Older leaves
