= Coffee wastewater =

Byproduct of coffee processing

Coffee wastewater, also known as coffee effluent, is a byproduct of coffee processing. Its treatment and disposal is an important environmental consideration for coffee processing as wastewater is a form of industrial water pollution.

The unpicked fruit of the coffee tree, known as the coffee cherry, undergoes a long process to make it ready for consumption. This process often entails use of large quantities of water and the production of considerable amounts of solid and liquid waste. The type of waste is a result of the type of process that the coffee cherries go through. The conversion of the cherry to oro (Note: Stemming from the Spanish word for gold, due to the colour of the dried bean) or green bean (the dried coffee bean which is ready to be exported) is achieved through either a dry, semi-washed or fully washed process.

== Processing ==
=== Dry ===
The coffee cherries are dried immediately after they are harvested through sun drying, solar drying or artificial drying. In sun drying, the coffee cherries are placed on a clean floor and left to dry in the open air. In solar drying, the cherries are placed in a closed cabinet, which has ventilation holes to let moisture out. Artificial drying is used mostly during the wet season, when the low level of sunlight extends the time needed for solar drying and the cherries are prone to mold growth. After being dried, the cherries are hulled. In this process the dried outer layer of the cherry, known as the pericarp, is removed mechanically.

=== Semi-washed ===
In semi-washed processing, the cherries are de-pulped to remove the pericarp. After this the slimy mucilage layer which covers the bean is removed. This is done mechanically by feeding the beans into a cylindrical device which conveys them upward. While the friction and pressure exerted on the beans by this process is enough to remove most of the mucilage, a small amount of it will still remain in the centre-cut of the beans. This technique is used in Colombia and Mexico in order to reduce the water consumption from the long fermentation process and the extensive washing.

==== Becolsub ====
In order to reduce the contamination generated by the wet process of coffee fruits, scientists at Cenicafé developed a technology that avoids using water when not needed and uses the right water when needed. The technology, called Becolsub (taken from the initials of the Spanish for ecological wet coffee process with by-products handling: Beneficio Ecologicos Sub-productos), controls more than 90% of the contamination generated by its predecessor. The quality of the coffee processed this way is the same as for coffee processed by natural fermentation.

The Becolsub technology consists of pulping without water, mechanical demucilaging and mixing the by-products (fruit outer-skin and mucilage) in a screw conveyor. The technology also includes a hydromechanical device to remove floating fruits and light impurities, as well as heavy and hard objects, and a cylindrical screen to remove the fruits whose skin was not separated in the pulping machine. Scientists at Cenicafé discovered that a coffee fruit with mucilage (immature and dry fruits have no mucilage) has enough water inside for the skin and seeds to be separated in conventional pulping machines without water, that the liquid was only required as a conveying means and that pulping without water avoids 72% of the potential contamination.

Mucilage removal has been done through a fermenting process, which takes between 14 and 18 hours, until the mucilage is degraded and can easily be removed with water. Washing fermented mucilage requires, in the best case, 5.0 L/kg of DPC. Scientists at Cenicafé developed a machine to remove the mucilage covering the coffee seeds. This machine, called Deslim (the initial letters of the Spanish demucilager, the mechanical washer and cleaner) removes more than 98% of the total mucilage (same as a well conducted fermentation) by exerting stress and generating collisions among beans, using only 0.7 L/kg of DPC. The resulting highly concentrated mixture of water, mucilage and impurities is viscous and is added to the separated fruit skin in a screw conveyor. In the screw conveyor the retention is greater than 60%, which means a 20% additional control of potential contamination.

The two by-products are widely used as worms' substrate to produce natural fertilizers. However, the high concentration of the mucilage obtained from the demucilager provides opportunity for industrializing the by-product.

=== Fully washed ===
This process is mainly used when processing Coffea arabica. After de-pulping, the beans are collected in fermentation tanks where bacterial removal of the mucilage takes place over 12 to 36 hours. The fermentation phase is important in the development of the flavour of the coffee, which is partially due to the microbiological processes that take place. The emergence of yeasts and moulds in acidic water can lead to off-flavors like sour coffee and onion-flavour. However, wet processing is believed to yield higher quality coffee than the other processes since small amounts of off-flavors give the coffee its particular taste and "body".

When fermentation is complete, the beans are washed thoroughly to remove fermentation residues and any remaining mucilage. If not removed, these cause decolouring of the parchment and make the beans susceptible to yeasts. After washing, the beans are dried. When the drying process is not rapid enough earthy and musty taints, like Rio-flavor come up.

== Water usage ==
The amount of water used in processing depends strongly on the type of processing. Wet fully washed processing of the coffee cherries requires the most fresh water, dry processing the least. Sources indicate a wide range in water use. Recycling of water in the de-pulping process can drastically reduce the amount needed. With reuse and improved washing techniques, up to 1 to 6 m^{3} water per tonne of fresh coffee cherry is achievable; without reuse a consumption of up to 20 m^{3}/tonne is possible.

Water use in coffee processing
Country	Process	Water use m^{3}/tonne cherry	Source
India	Semi-washed, wet processing	3	
Kenya	Fully washed, reuse of water	4–6	
Colombia	Fully washed and environmental processing (BECOLSUB)	1–6	
Papua New Guinea	Fully washed, recycling use of water	4–8	
Vietnam	Semi wet and fully washed	4–15	
Vietnam	Traditional, fully washed	20	
India	Traditional, fully washed	14–17	
Brazil	Semi-washed, mechanical demucilage	4	
Mexico	Semi-washed, mechanical demucilage	3.4	
Nicaragua	Traditional, fully washed	16	
Nicaragua	Fully washed, reuse of water	11	

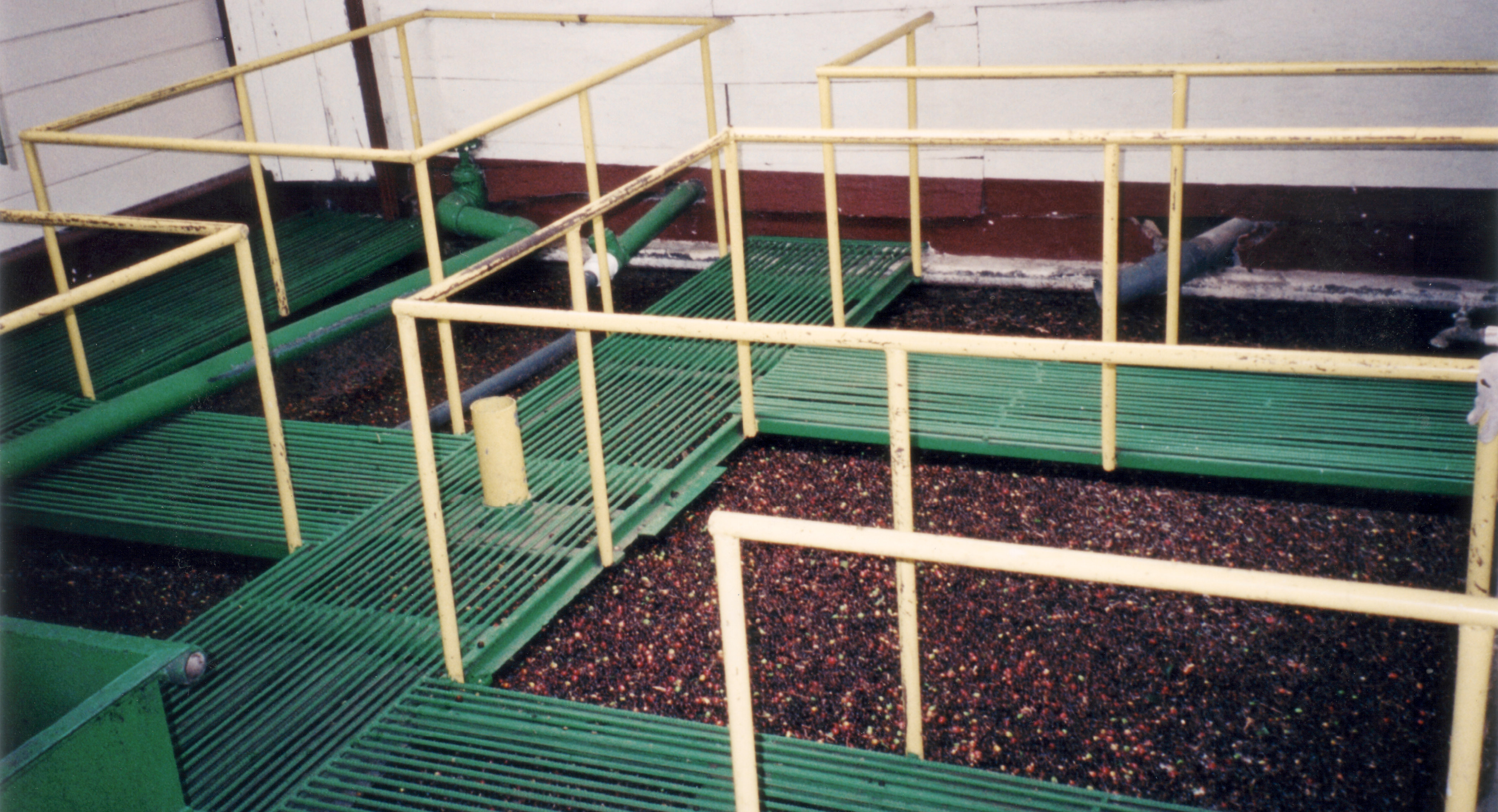
Coffee cherries being separated using water in separation vats

Water used in processing coffee leaves the coffee processing unit with high levels of pollution. The main component is organic matter, stemming from de-pulping and mucilage removal. The majority of organic material in the wastewater is highly resistant and COD values, the amount of oxygen required to stabilize organic matter by using a strong oxidant, make up 80% of the pollution load, with values as high as 50 g/L. The BOD, the amount of oxygen required for the biological decomposition of organic matter under aerobic conditions at a standardized temperature and time of incubation, coming from biodegradable organic material can reach values of 20 g/L.

With a (rough) screening and removal of the pulp COD and BOD values become considerably lower. Values in the range of 3–5 g/L for COD and 1.5–3 g/L for BOD_{5} (Note: BOD values after 5 days) were found. Recorded values of 2.5 g/L for COD and 1.5 g/L for BOD_{5}.

A large part of the organic matter, pectins, precipitates as mucilated solids and could be taken out of the water. When these solids are not removed and pH values rise and an increase in COD can be observed.

In order to optimize the anaerobic processing of the wastewater pH values should be between 6.5 and 7.5, instead of the generally present values of pH=4, which is highly acidic. This is obtained by adding calcium hydroxide (CaOH_{2}) to the wastewater. This resulted in a regained solubility of the pectins, raising COD from an average of 3.7 g/L to an average of 12.7 g/L.

The water is further characterised by the presence of flavonoid compounds, coming from the skin of the cherries. Flavonoid compounds result in dark colouration of the water at a pH=7 or higher, but they do not add to BOD or COD levels of the wastewater, nor have major environmental impacts. Lower levels of transparency, however, can have a negative impact on photosynthetic processes and growth and nutrient transformations by (especially) rooted water plants. Many efforts in olive and wine processing industries, with relatively large funds for research, have been trying to find a solution for this problem. Calvert mentions research done into the removal of polyphenolics and flavonoid compounds by species of wood digesting fungi (Basidiomycetes) in a submerged solution with aeration using compressed air. These complex processes seemed to be able to remove the colour compounds, but simplified, cheaper techniques using other types of fungi (i.e. Geotrichum, Penicillium, Aspergillus) only thrived in highly diluted wastewaters.

Coffee wastewater is not a constant flow of water with uniform loadings of contamination. The processing of coffee cherries is a batch process and regarding water flows, two processes can be determined: de-pulping and fermentation/washing.

=== De-pulping ===
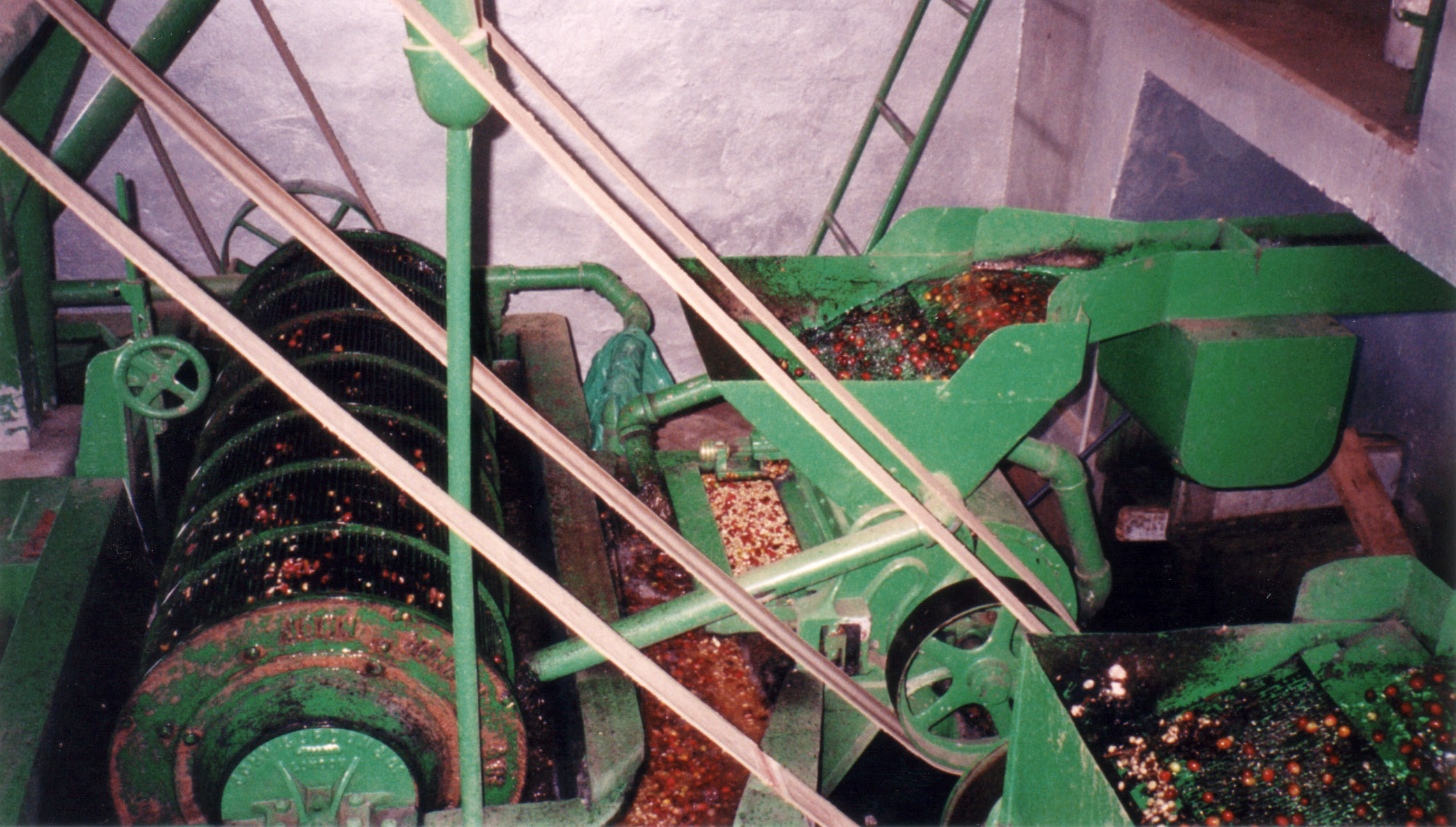
A mechanical separator de-pulps coffee cherries with the aid of water

The water used for de-pulping of the cherries is referred to as pulping water. It accounts for just over half of the water used in the process. According to Von Enden and Calvert, "pulping water consists of quickly fermenting sugars from both pulp and mucilage components. Pulp and mucilage consists to a large extent of proteins, sugars and the mucilage in particular of pectins, i.e. polysaccharide carbohydrates. These sugars are fermenting using the enzymes from the bacteria on the cherries. Other components in pulping water are acids and toxic chemicals like polyphenolics (tannins) or alkaloids (caffeine).

Pulping water can be reused during the de-pulping of the harvest of one day. This results in an increase in organic matter and a decrease in pH. Research in Nicaragua showed COD averages rising from 5,400 mg/L up to 8,400 mg/L with most of the pulp removed. The drop in pH can be attributed to the start of fermentation of the pulping water. This drop continues until fermentation is finished and pH levels of around 4 are reached. The nutrient content of the pulping water at the maximum COD load, which was considered to reflect maximum pollution, was determined during this research. Total nitrogen (TN) concentration in the samples ranged from 50 to 110 mg/L with an average over all samples of 90 mg/L. Total phosphorus (TP) concentration in the samples ranged from 8.9 to 15.2 mg/L with an average over all samples of 12.4 mg/L.

=== Washing ===
Washing of the fermented beans leads to wastewater containing mainly pectins from the mucilage, proteins and sugars. The fermentation of the sugars (disaccharide carbohydrates) into ethanol and CO_{2} leads to acid conditions in the washing water. The ethanol is converted in acetic acids after reaction with oxygen, lowering the pH to levels of around 4. The high acidity can negatively affect the treatment efficiency of treatment facilities treating the coffee wastewater like an anaerobic reactor or constructed wetlands and is considered to be detrimental for aquatic life when discharged directly into surface waters.

During the washing process the research in Nicaragua showed a clear decrease in contamination of the wastewater. The COD values drop from an average of 7,200 mg/L to less than 50 mg/L. Despite the fact that wastewater with COD values below 200 mg/L is allowed to be discharged in the natural waterways in Nicaragua it is advisable to redirect all the wastewater to the treatment system. This is because COD levels cannot be determined onsite during the washing process and discharge of the wastewater into surface waters is based on visual inspection. When the water is "clear" it is considered to be clean enough but the COD values measured during the research showed that discharge generally was to soon, resulting in wastewater with higher levels of COD than permitted. Another positive effect of diverting the wastewater to a treatment system is the dilution of the wastewater which enables better treatment by anaerobic bacteria due to more favourable pH values and better post-treatment due to lower concentrations of ammonium.

TN concentration in the samples of wastewater stemming from washing ranged from 40 to 150 mg/L with an average over all samples of 110 mg/L. TP concentration in the samples ranged from 7.8 to 15.8 mg/L with an average over all samples of 10.7 mg/L.

== Bibliography ==
- Bello-Mendoza, R.; Calvo-Bado, L.A.; Sánchez-Vázquez, J.E.; Lau-Chong, G.; Cuevas-González, R. (1995). "Diagnóstico de la contaminación en las aguas residuales de los benefidos húmedos de café en el Soconu sco, Chiapas, México". Proc. XVI Latin American Symposium on Coffee Cultivation, 20–25 October 1993, Managua, Nicaragua. Tegucigalpa, Honduras: PROMECAFE-IICA. pp. 1–13.
- Bello-Mendoza, R.; Castillo-Rivera, M.F. (1998). "Start-up of an Anaerobic Hybrid UASB/Filter Reactor Treating Wastewater from a Coffee Processing Plant". Anaerobe. 4 (5): 219–225. doi:10.1006/anae.1998.0171. PMID 16887646.
- "Estudio y diseño de la Planta de Tratamiento de los Desechos del Café en la finca "San Luis".". BIOMAT 1992. Matagalpa, Nicaragua: Alcaldía de Matagalpa and Oficina Biogás y Saneamiento Ambiental.
- Calvert, Ken C. (1997). "The treatment of Coffee Wastewater — The Biogas Option. A Review and Preliminary Report of Ongoing Research". Coffee Research Report no. 50. Kainantu, Papua New Guinea: Coffee Industry Corporation Ltd.
- Calvert, Ken C. (1998). "The Microbiology of Coffee Processing, part 1" (DOC). PNGCRI Coffee Research Newsletter.
- Calvert, Ken C. (1999). "The Microbiology of Coffee Processing, part 3". PNGCRI Coffee Research Newsletter.
- Cuervo, Adriana Maria (1997). beneficio ecológico del café con manejo de subproductos (PDF). CIAO. Archived from the original (PDF) on 2016-03-06.
- Deepa, G.B.; Chanakya, H.N.; de Alwis, A.A.P.; Manjunath, G.R.; Devi, V. (2002). "Overcoming Pollution of Lakes and Water Bodies Due to Coffee Pulping Activities With Appropriate Technology Solutions". Proceedings "Symposium on Conservation, Restoration and Management of Aquatic Ecosystems". Canada: Centre for Ecological Sciences, Indian Institute of Science (IIS) and the Karnataka Environment Research Foundation [KERF], Bangalore and Commonwealth of Learning. paper 4.
- De Matos, T, A.; Lo Monaco, P.A.; Pinto, A.B.; Fia, R.; Fukunaga, D.C. (2001). "Pollutant Potential of Wastewater of the Coffee Fruits Processing". Environment and the Water. Viçosa-MG, Brazil: Federal University of Viçosa, Department of Agricultural Engineering.
- Droste, R. L. (1997). Theory and Practice of Water and Wastewater Treatment. Hoboken, Canada: John Wiley & Sons, Inc.
- Grendelman, E.R. (2006). Tratar las Aguas Mieles (Unpublished internship paper thesis). Netherlands: Wageningen University, sub-departments: Irrigation & Water Engineering Group and Environmental Technology.
- Murthy, K.V.N.; D'Sa, A.; Kapur, G. (2004). An effluent treatment-cum-electricity generation option at coffee estates: is it financially feasible? (Draft version ed.). Bangalore: International Energy Initiative.
- Nemerow, Nelson Leonard (1971). "Coffee Wastes". Liquid waste of industry: theories, practices, and treatment. Addison-Wesley Pub. Co.
- Treagust, J. (1994). Coffee Waste Water Treatment (B.Sc. (Hons.) thesis). Cranfield, United Kingdom: Cranfield University.
- Von Enden, Jan C. (2002). "Best practices at wet processing pay financial benefits to farmers and processors" (PDF). GTZ-PPP Project "Improvement of Coffee Quality and Sustainability of Coffee Production in Vietnam".
- Von Enden, Jan C.; Calvert, Ken C. (2002a). Review of Coffee Waste Water Characteristics and Approaches to Treatment (PDF).
- Von Enden, Jan C.; Calvert, Ken C. (2002b). "Limit Environmental Damage By Basic Knowledge of Coffee Waste Waters" (PDF). GTZ-PPP Project "Improvement of Coffee Quality and Sustainability of Coffee Production in Vietnam".
