= Coffee production in Madagascar =

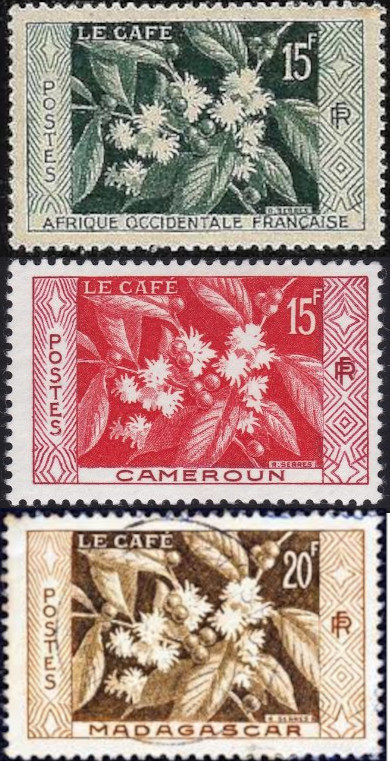
Coffee stamps issued in French Africa in 1956, featuring Madagascan coffee (bottom)

As of 2023, Madagascar was the 23rd-largest producer of coffee, producing 49,344 tonnes.

== History ==
Coffee production was introduced to Madagascar from Réunion. The main exporter of African coffee in 1930, Madagascar suffered a serious crisis in coffee growing at the end of the 1990s.

== Production ==
Madagascar primarily produces Coffea robusta.

== See also ==
- List of countries by coffee production
- Agriculture in Madagascar
