= Coffee production =

Industrial process

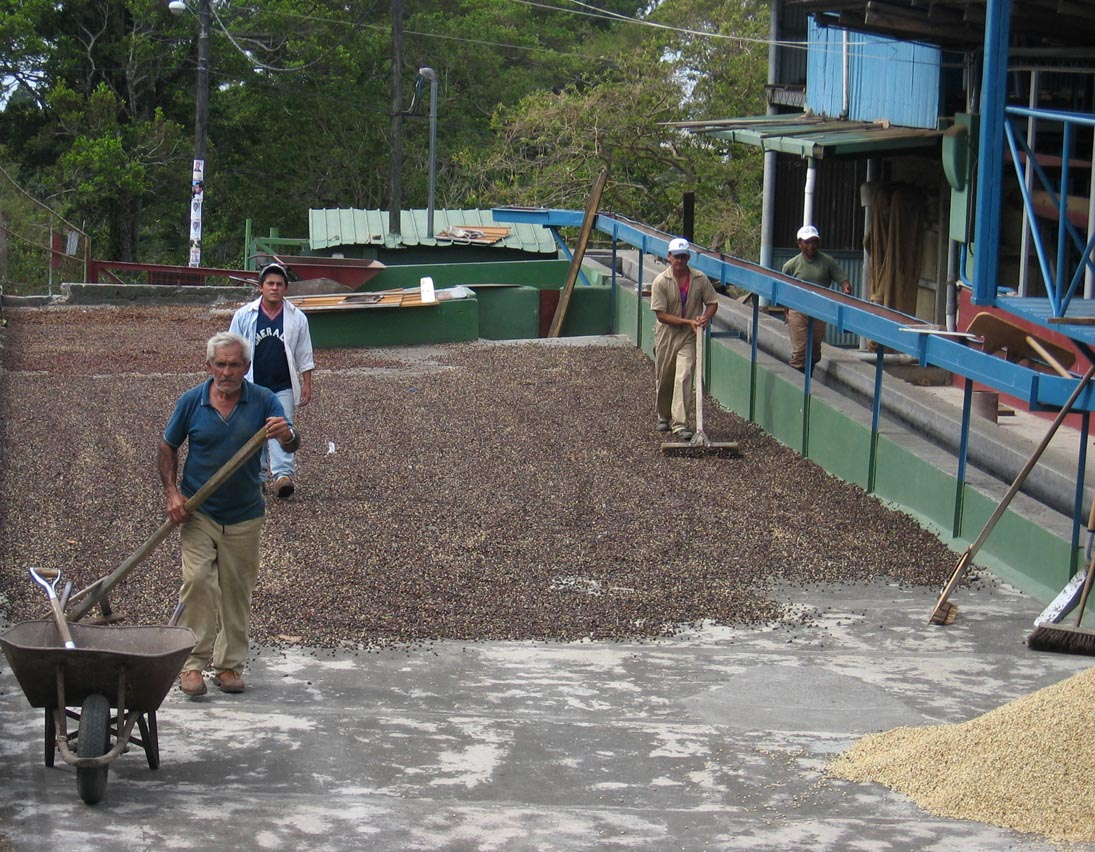
Traditional coffee drying in Boquete, Panamá

Coffee production is the industrial process of converting the raw fruit (the coffee cherry) of the coffee plant into finished coffee beans. About eight months after coffee cherries appear on a coffee plant, the cherries are harvested either by hand or by machine. Then they are, depending on the method, pulped and then dried or simply set out to dry. After this, the beans are stripped of their remaining dry skin and fruit residue. Once they are cleaned, sorted, and graded, they are suitable for distribution. While all green coffee, produced from immature coffee beans, is processed, the method that is used to process coffee varies, and significantly affects the flavor of coffee once it is roasted and brewed. Coffee production is a major source of income for 12.5 million households, most in developing countries.

== Producing countries ==
Coffee cultivation by species: robusta robusta and arabica arabica

About 70 countries grow coffee. The two main species are not distributed evenly among them. Latin America produces most of the world's arabica; Asia produces most of its robusta. Africa grows both in roughly equal measure, arabica mainly in the east and robusta across east and west. Brazil, India, Indonesia, Uganda and Vietnam grow both. Most other producing countries grow only one. Arabica accounts for almost 60 per cent of world output, down from about 75 per cent in 1965. Brazil leads arabica production, followed by Colombia, Ethiopia and Honduras; Vietnam leads robusta, followed by Brazil, Indonesia, India and Uganda. Some arabica countries, including Mexico, Nicaragua and Guatemala, have begun growing robusta as well, while Cameroon, Ivory Coast, Ghana and Madagascar are trying to revive abandoned robusta plantings.

Coffee is priced in categories that combine origin with processing method. The International Coffee Organization's daily indicator prices distinguish four groups: Colombian mild arabicas, other mild arabicas, Brazilian and other natural arabicas, and robustas. The first two are washed coffees, the second of them mainly from Central America.

== Picking ==
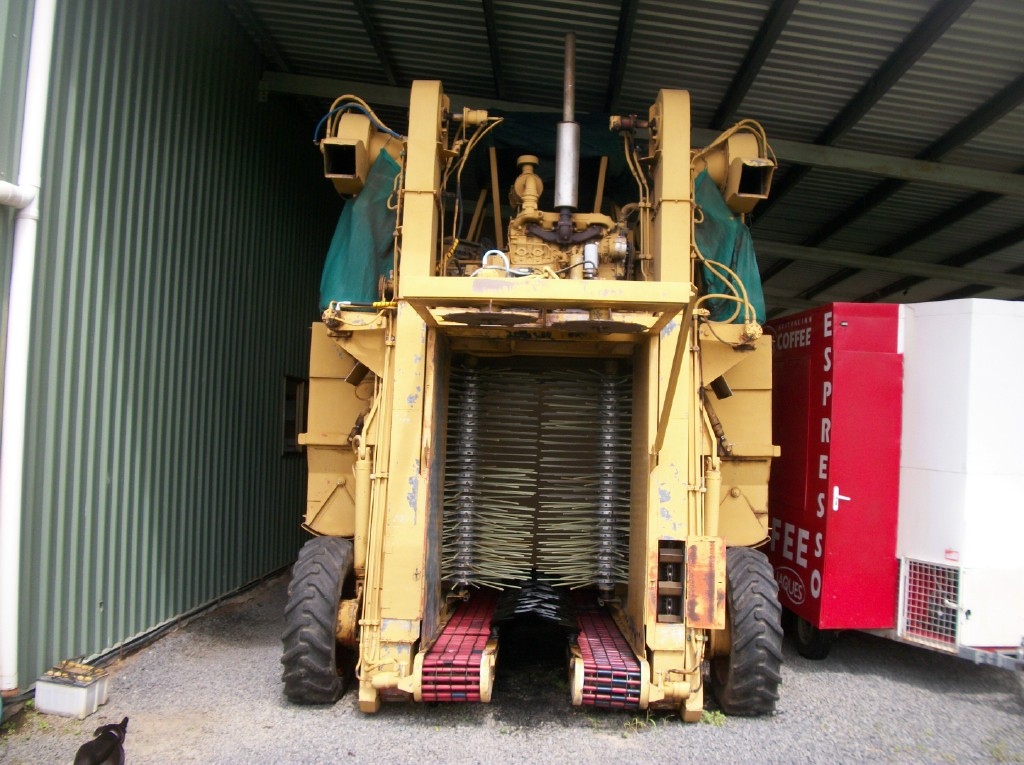
Coffee bean harvesting machine, Mareeba, Queensland, Australia

A coffee plant usually starts to produce flowers three to four years after it is planted, and it is from these flowers that the fruits of the plant (commonly known as coffee cherries) appear, with the first useful harvest possible around five years after planting. The cherries ripen around eight months after the emergence of the flower, by changing color from green to red, and it is at this time that they should be harvested. In most coffee-growing countries, there is one major harvest a year; though in countries like Colombia, where there are two flowerings a year, there is a main and secondary crop. The main Colombian harvest runs from October to December, and the secondary or mitaca crop from April to June.

In most countries, the coffee crop is picked by hand, a labor-intensive and difficult process, though in places like Brazil, where the landscape is relatively flat and the coffee fields are immense, the process has been mechanized. Whether picked by hand or by machine, all coffee is harvested in one of two ways:

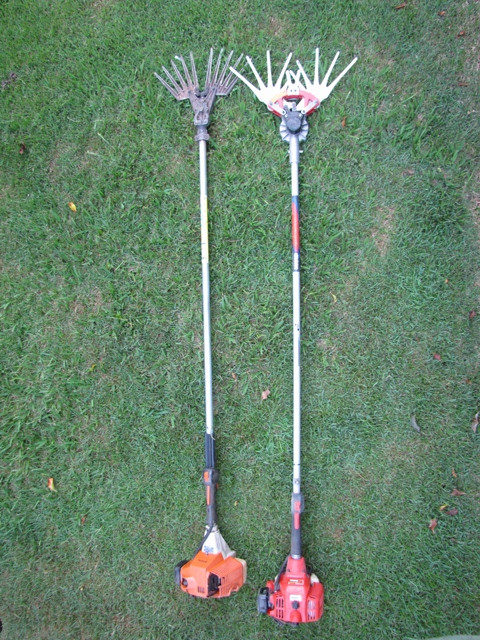
Mechanical strippers used for coffee fruit harvesting

Strip picked

All coffee fruit is removed from the tree, regardless of maturation state. This can either be done by machine or by hand. In the first method, pickers generally place a canvas on the ground. They then grab the branch next to the trunk with their hands and pull outward, knocking all of the fruit onto the ground. After doing this with all branches and trees for the length of the canvas, the pickers then collect the coffee in bags. This process can be facilitated through the use of mechanical strippers.

Selectively picked

Only the ripe cherries are harvested and they are picked individually by hand. Pickers rotate among the trees every eight to ten days, choosing only the cherries which are at the peak of ripeness. Because this kind of harvest is labor-intensive, and thus more costly, it is used primarily to harvest the finer arabica beans.

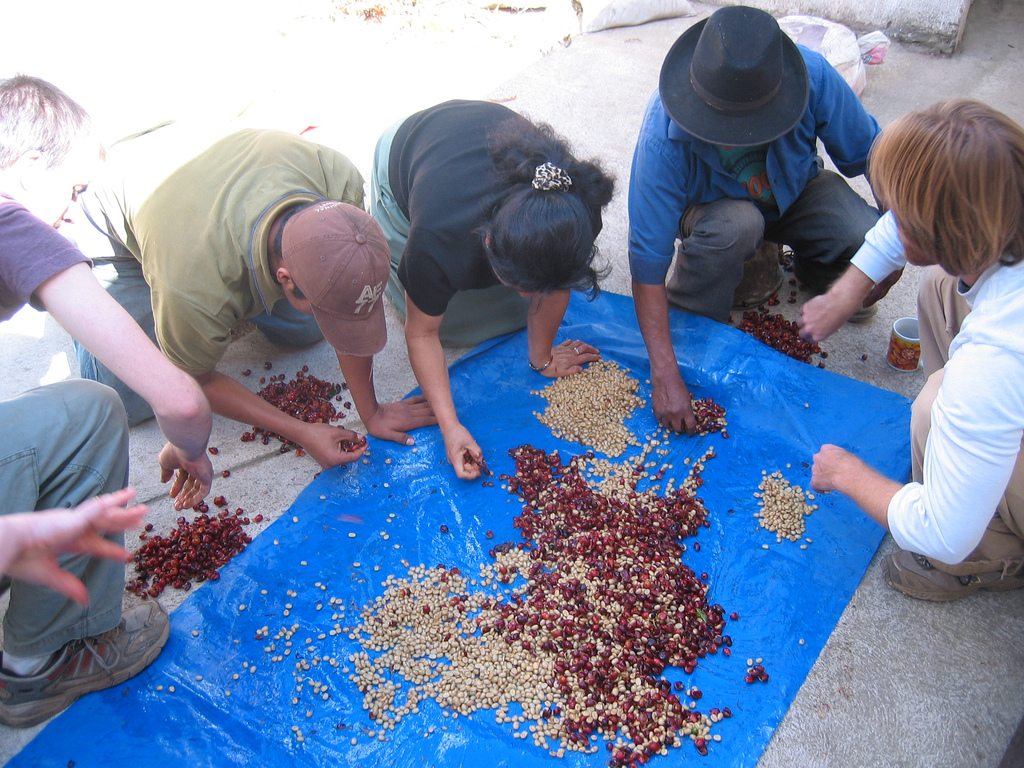
Workers pulping coffee beans in Guatemala

Pickers may be told to leave green cherries on the tree, since the seed inside is not yet fully formed. The International Trade Centre holds that the best quality comes from selective picking, taking only red, ripe cherries by hand over successive rounds until most of the crop is in. Stripping is faster — a picker can harvest three to four times as much in a day — but takes ripe and unripe fruit together. Workers who pick coffee by hand are generally paid a piece rate based on the weight or volume of cherries collected, or a daily wage.

Holdings of under two hectares make up about 80 per cent of the world's coffee farms and produce some 60 per cent of the crop; the rest comes in roughly equal parts from estates of more than fifty hectares and from medium-sized farms of five to fifty. Alongside the growers themselves, an estimated 100 million people are employed seasonally on coffee farms and in downstream processing and trade.

Piecework and daily payment predominate on Colombian farms. In a 2016 survey of 7,578 coffee pickers by the National Federation of Coffee Growers, half were paid by the kilogram collected, 37.5 percent received a daily wage, 11 percent were unpaid family workers and 1.5 percent were employees; piecework rates ranged from US$0.02 to US$0.21 per kilogram and the average daily wage was US$6.70, with men earning about 12 percent more than women.

Smallholders in Ethiopia and Uganda mostly hire casual labor paid by task or piece rate during the harvest peak, and what a picker earns in a day depends not only on the rate but on how much ripe fruit the trees carry. Harvesters at sites dominated by Fairtrade-certified producers in those two countries received piece rates about 20 percent lower than elsewhere and earned less per day. On farms in Latin America, piece rates are often combined with production quotas for tasks such as weeding and fertilizing. Hired labor is needed across the season rather than only at harvest, for pruning and weeding as well as picking, and it has to be paid before the crop is sold; growers without access to credit are correspondingly constrained in how much help they can take on, and families short of labor tend to use herbicides and pesticides in place of hand weeding. The labor-rights organization Verité has argued that piece-rate pay does not guarantee the legal minimum wage, and that where controls are weak it goes together with unpaid overtime and with child labor, as families bring children to the fields to meet quotas.

The United States Department of Labor's List of Goods Produced by Child Labor or Forced Labor, in its edition of 5 September 2024, lists coffee from seventeen countries; Brazilian and Ivorian coffee are listed for forced labor as well as child labor. The International Labour Organization and UNICEF estimated that about 138 million children were in child labor worldwide in 2024, 61 per cent of them in agriculture. A social life cycle assessment of primary coffee production in Brazil identified child labor as one of the sector's principal social risks, alongside low trade union density, long working hours and wages close to the cost of living. Its authors treated their estimate as an indicator of structural risk, derived from national employment statistics, and not as a count of children working in coffee. In June 2024 the ILO, with the Food and Agriculture Organization, the International Trade Centre and UNICEF, launched an EU-funded project, CLEAR Supply Chains, which addresses the causes of child labor in the coffee supply chains of Honduras, Uganda and Vietnam through area-based interventions rather than farm-level auditing alone.

A 2020 International Labour Organization study of five major producing countries found that coffee workers earned less than the national average wage, and less than the average agricultural wage, in every country examined. Median monthly earnings for employees were roughly US$20 in Ethiopia, $76 in Indonesia, $110 in India, $116 in Vietnam and $350 in Costa Rica, in 2020 dollars. An estimated 45 percent of coffee employees in Costa Rica and 91 percent in Indonesia earned less than the legal minimum wage; Ethiopia has no minimum wage. Women earned substantially less than men. In a 2025 focus-group study of workers on specialty coffee farms in Honduras and El Salvador, participants said their daily wages were no higher, and sometimes lower, than on conventional farms, though longer periods of employment could raise their annual income. Several complained that the price premiums growers received for specialty coffee were not passed on to workers.

The seed inside an unripe cherry is not fully formed, so lots that include unripe fruit yield more defective beans. Immature or drought-affected coffee produces quakers, pale yellow beans with little or no grain, which affect the quality of the cup. Most can be removed in the washing channel. Modern equipment can separate ripe, unripe and overripe cherries reasonably well, so that each can be processed separately.

=== Wet process ===
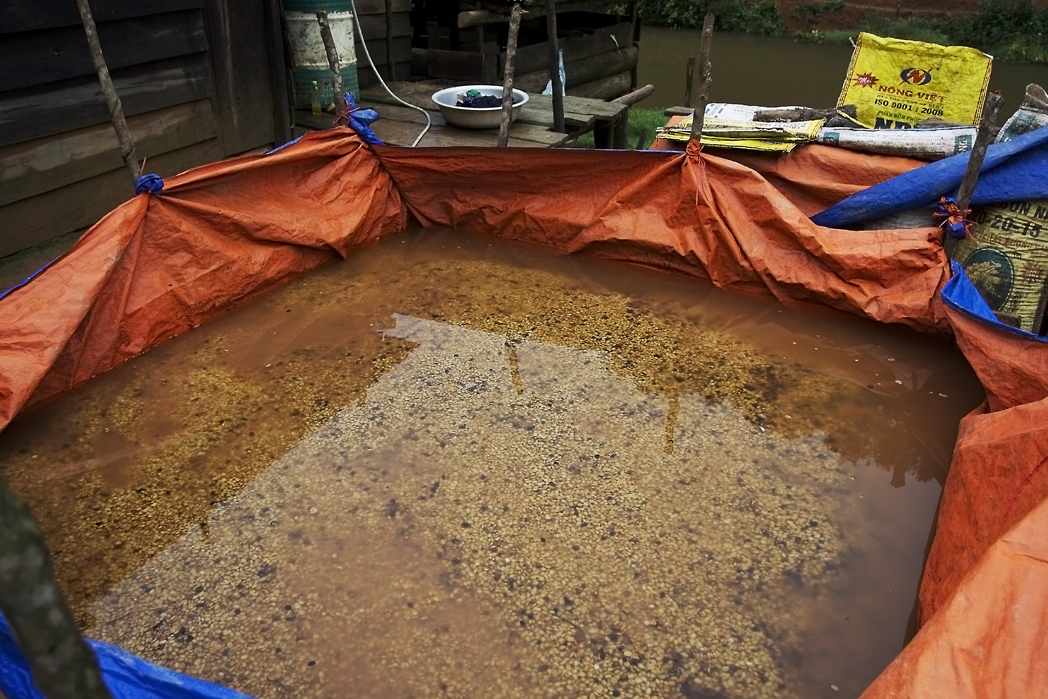
A field-expedient coffee fermentation tank in Vietnam

In the "wet process", the fruit covering the coffee beans is removed before they are dried. It is one of the three traditional processing methods, alongside the natural or dry process and the pulped natural or honey process, and the coffee it yields is called washed. The International Trade Centre describes the washed method as the most common of the three and as often producing the highest quality, while noting that it demands considerable skill and a great deal of water.

Before pulping, the fruit is cleaned and graded. Winnowing removes dust, leaves and stems by airflow, perforated screens sift out material larger or smaller than the cherries, and hydraulic separation in water divides the crop by density. Flotation sorts by weight rather than by ripeness. What rises is light material: leaves and twigs, cherries that dried on the tree, some overripe fruit, and fruit of any ripeness left underweight by pests, disease or poor development of the bean. Unripe and semi-ripe cherries generally sink, along with stones. Pulping then separates the pulp from the parchment coffee, using disc, drum or screen pulpers, some of which also sort out unripe cherries.

The bean still carries a good deal of pulp. This is removed either by the classic ferment-and-wash method or by mechanical demucilaging, also called machine-assisted wet processing or aquapulping. Mechanical demucilators work by friction, between the beans and against the metal parts of the machine, with a little water added to lubricate and carry the mucilage away; they need less labor and less water than washing in tanks or channels.

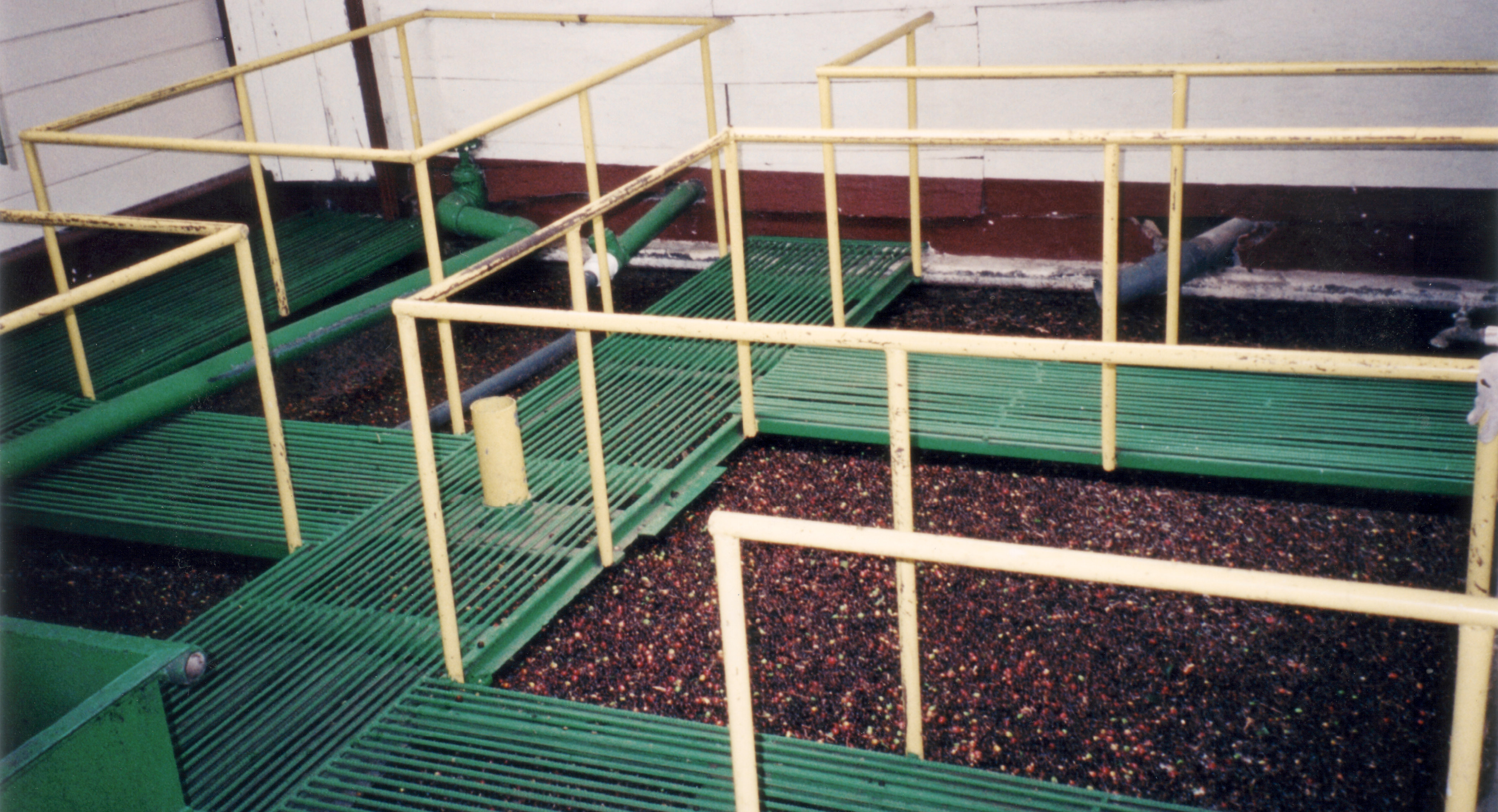
Sorting coffee in water

In the ferment-and-wash method of wet processing, the remainder of the pulp is removed by breaking down the cellulose by fermenting the beans with microbes and then washing them with large amounts of water. Fermentation can be done with extra water or, in "dry fermentation", in the fruit's own juices only. The two give noticeably different results, underwater fermentation being said to emphasize acidity and aroma and to suppress some astringency.

How much oxygen the fermentation gets is a further variable. In the Indonesian Labu method the pulped fruit is sealed into polypropylene bags with as much air as possible expelled, so that anaerobic organisms dominate and produce secondary metabolites unlike those of an open tank; fermentation takes correspondingly longer and the bags must be turned. The cup is described as tasting of wild red fruit, with a sharp acidity. The authors of The Craft and Science of Coffee draw an explicit parallel with winemaking, where fermentation is likewise decisive, and suggest coffee has yet to follow it in replacing simple tanks with vessels in which temperature, pH, oxygen and microbiota are all controlled.

Carbonic maceration takes its name from winemaking and has been adapted to coffee. Fermenting the fruit under carbon dioxide suppresses aerobic respiration and favors fermentative metabolism, which changes the community of microorganisms that develops. In trials on arabica at 18, 28 and 38 °C, the fungal part of that community shifted most at the lower temperatures after about three days. A Thai trial of a semi-carbonic variant held the fruit at 15 or 20 °C for ten days. It scored higher than a pulped natural control for fragrance, flavor, aftertaste, body and balance, and 51 volatile compounds were identified across the treatments.

Fermentation has to be watched closely, or the coffee turns sour. How long it takes depends on the temperature, the thickness of the mucilage layer and the concentration of the enzymes at work; published figures run from about twelve hours to thirty-six. Millers judge the end point by touch, the parchment losing its slimy coating and turning gritty underneath the fingers. The coffee is then washed thoroughly in clean water, in tanks or in purpose-built washing machines.

The fermentation process produces wastewater that contains a high organic load, which should be prevented from entering fresh water supplies. In machine-assisted wet processing, fermentation is not used to separate the bean from the remainder of the pulp; rather, this is done through mechanical scrubbing. This reduces both water use and the generation of wastewater. Mechanical demucilaging gives a more consistent result than fermentation, because every bean receives the same treatment, and it avoids the 2 to 3 per cent loss of weight that fermentation causes. The two methods do not taste the same: mechanically demucilaged beans are generally described as having a sharper acidity, and fermented beans a juicier and finer one. Rinsing the beans before drying improves the quality of mechanically demucilaged coffee.

Low-water milling equipment involves trade-offs of its own. As less water is used, damage to the parchment and the beans tends to increase, more parchment is lost with the pulp and more pulp is left mixed with the parchment, which in turn affects fermentation and cup quality; reducing water consumption is also harder in large mills than in small ones. Conveying the coffee dry, on elevators and belts rather than in water channels, is an alternative to reducing the water in the mill itself.

Mucilage removal is the only stage of the wet process that requires water, and it is the source of the coffee wastewater. Using less water does not lessen the pollution so much as concentrate it: the lower the water consumption, the higher the organic load of the effluent. Ecologically sensitive farms reprocess the wastewater along with the shell and mucilage as compost to be used in soil fertilization programs. Dried mucilage recovered from mill wastewater has useful fertilizing properties, and nitrogen-rich coffee pulp can replace artificial fertilizer on the plantation. Water use varies widely. Conventional wet processing may consume 20 to 100 cubic metres of water per tonne of green coffee, the lower end of that range reached only where water is recycled, while ecological wet milling — dry reception of the cherries, machines that use as little water as possible and conveyance of the coffee and its by-products without water — should require under 10 cubic metres and ideally under 5. The most efficient upward-flow mucilage removers are claimed to use under one cubic metre per tonne of dry parchment, the lowest of any mucilage removal system.

Most of the fruit does not become coffee: a tonne of fresh cherry yields only about 200 kilograms of green arabica or 220 of robusta. A handbook on circular economy models in coffee production published by the United Nations Development Programme puts the husk left by dry processing at some 45 per cent of the dry cherry weight, about 0.9 tonnes for every tonne of dry beans, and reports that wet processing can generate 2.5 to 3.5 tonnes of fresh pulp and mucilage and 40 to 45 cubic metres of wastewater for the same output. Coffee processing has been estimated to generate more than 40 million tonnes of residual biomass a year, which can be composted or turned into biofuel, biochar or cascara.

After the pulp has been removed, what is left is the bean surrounded by two additional layers: the silver skin and the parchment. Washed coffee leaves the mill at about 53 per cent moisture, and must be dried to 10–12 per cent on a wet basis before it is stable. At that level the water activity of the bean falls to about 0.65–0.68, below the 0.77–0.83 needed for Aspergillus ochraceus to grow and well below the 0.83–0.87 at which it produces ochratoxin A. Coffee above 12 per cent moisture may be rejected at the buying station. Drying is a critical stage, because poor drying can undo the quality achieved at every earlier step.

Coffee beans can be dried in the sun or by machine. Mechanical drying takes hours where sun drying takes days, and the two do not give the same cup: the long sun-drying period can cause the seed to begin germinating, which is held to give a more desirable flavor.

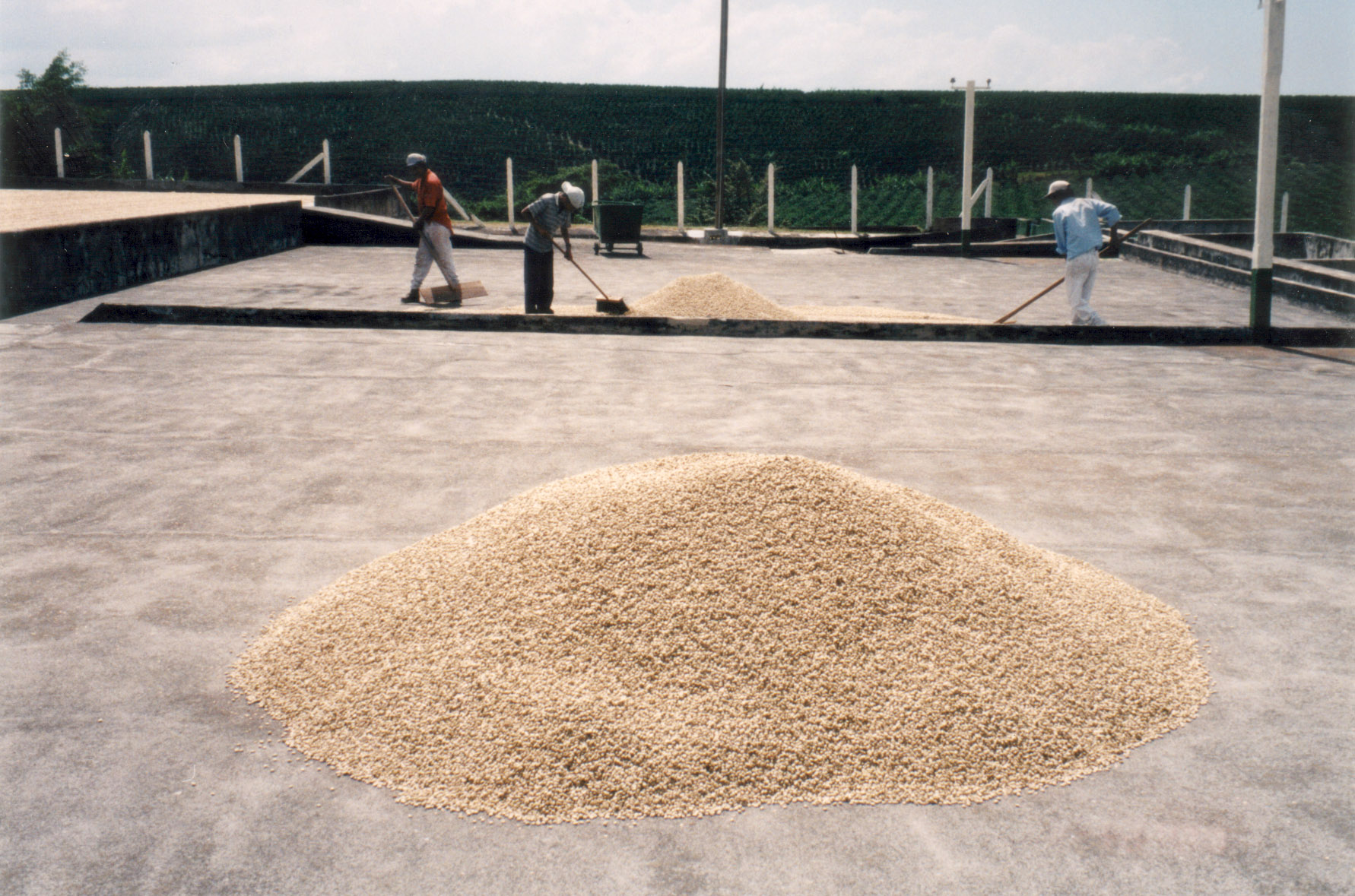
Coffee drying in the sun. Doka Plantation Costa Rica

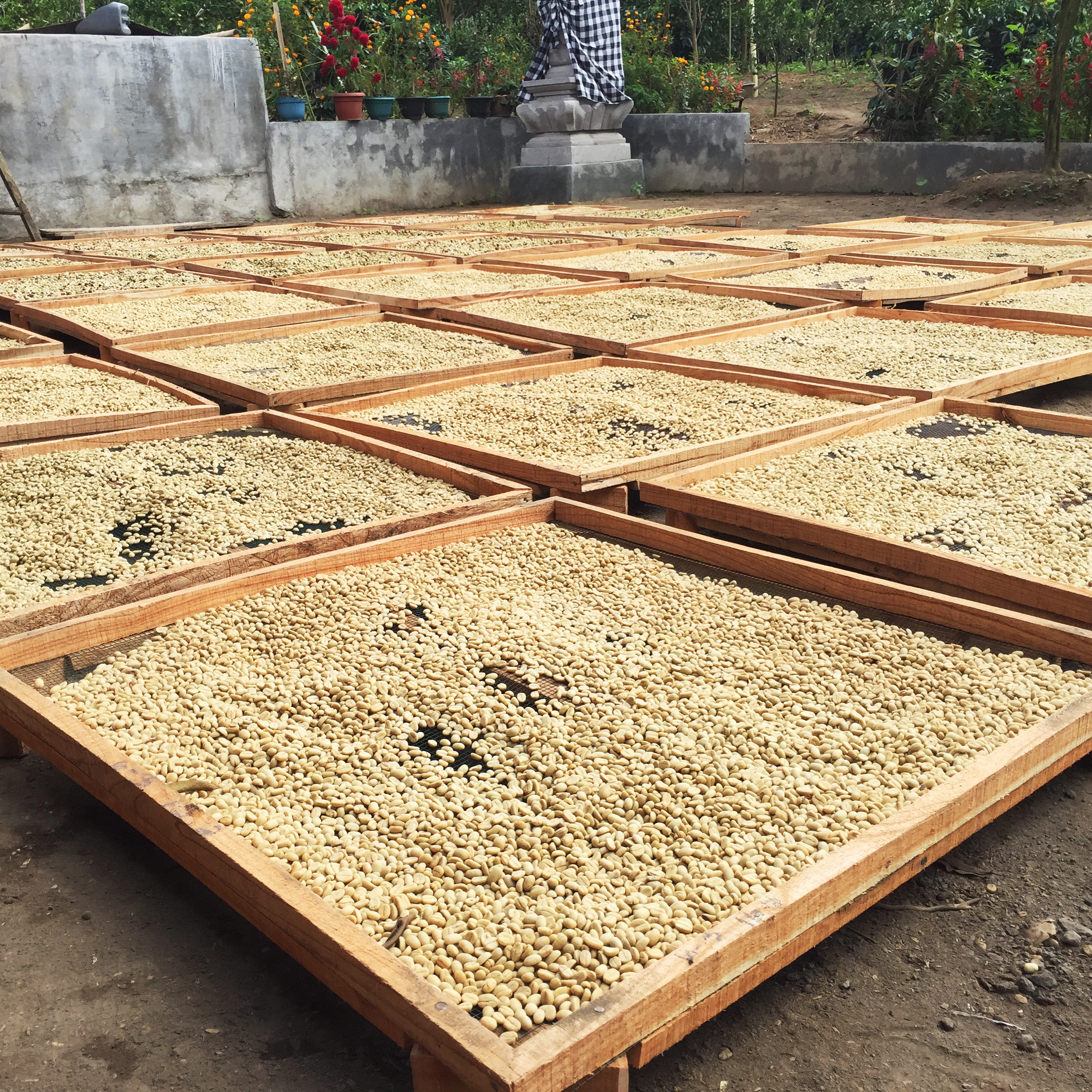
Coffee beans drying. Drying racks are called 'para para' in Indonesia

Sun drying spreads the wet coffee on a flat surface and turns it so that it dries evenly. It may be done on patios or raised beds, in the open air or under cover in greenhouses or parabolic dryers. Drying on patios takes a great deal of space and labor, sometimes running to weeks. Mechanical dryers instead pass heated air through the coffee, and include static or fixed-bed, vertical, and horizontal rotary or Guardiola types. Drying too fast, or with the coffee mass above about 40 °C for parchment and 45 °C for cherry, damages quality and shortens the shelf life of the green coffee, while drying too slowly allows mold and other microbial growth.

=== Dry process ===
Dry process, also known as unwashed or natural coffee, is the oldest method of processing coffee. The whole fruit is cleaned after harvest and then dried in the sun, on trestle tables or spread thinly across a patio.

Before drying begins the crop is graded and cleaned, so that unripe, overripe and damaged fruit is set aside along with soil, twigs, leaves and other field debris. Hand winnowing over a wide sieve does most of this work, and whatever the draft fails to carry off is picked off the mesh. Flotation in a water channel beside the drying ground can be used to the same end.

The fruit is laid out in the sun, on concrete or brick patios or on waist-height trestle beds of matting, and is turned by hand or with rakes so that it dries evenly. Sun drying on patios is the cheapest and most energy-efficient method, though rain and excessively strong sunlight can both spoil the crop. Depending on the weather, four weeks may pass before the fruit reaches the maximum moisture content of 12.5 per cent. On bigger estates the crop may be started on the patio and moved into machine driers after a few days. Various types of mechanical drier exist, heated by direct or indirect fire or by a hot-water or steam boiler and fueled by wood, coffee husk, other solid fuels, fuel oil, diesel or gas.

Drying governs the final quality of the green bean more than any other stage. Taken too far, the coffee turns brittle and shatters in the huller, and broken beans count as defects; stopped too early, the moisture left behind opens the crop to fungal and bacterial spoilage.

Once dry, the fruit is held in bulk silos until it goes to the mill for hulling, sorting, grading and bagging, where a single pass through the hulling machine strips every outer layer at once.

Around 90 per cent of Brazilian arabica is handled this way, as is most coffee from Ethiopia, Haiti and Paraguay and part of the arabica crop of India and Ecuador; nearly all robusta is dry-processed. The method depends on dry harvest weather, and is impractical where the air stays humid or rain falls often during picking.

=== Semi-dry process ===
Two distinct methods fall between the wet and dry processes and are often grouped together as semi-dry or semi-washed. In both, the outer skin is removed as in wet processing, but the later steps differ.

Pulped natural or honey process

The skin is removed and the mucilage is left on the parchment; the beans are fermented and dried with it in place, and the washing step is omitted. Depending on how much mucilage is retained, the result is described as yellow, red or black honey. Yellow honey, from which part of the mucilage has been removed mechanically, dries in about eight to ten days; red honey retains roughly half to three quarters of the mucilage and takes twelve to fifteen; black honey is dried with all of it and takes around thirty days, needing frequent turning to stop the beans sticking together, which makes it the most demanding of the three. The method was first tried at the Instituto Agronômico de Campinas in Brazil in the early 1950s and taken up commercially by farmers in southern Minas Gerais in the 1980s; the Brazilian product is known as cereja descascado. The process uses considerably less water than the wet method, and the cup is typically described as mellow and sweet, with mild acidity and fruit or honey notes. Sugars and other compounds from the retained mucilage migrate into the beans during the long fermentation, which a study of honey-processed robusta identified as the source of its distinct flavor.

Wet-hulled process

Wet hulling, known in Indonesia as giling basah ("wet grinding"), is used by smallholders in Sumatra, Sulawesi, Flores and Papua. Its distinctive feature is that the parchment is removed while the bean is still wet, rather than after drying. The practice is a response to Indonesia's climate: the rainy season coincides with the harvest, drying can otherwise take two to three weeks, and the coffee has to be dried quickly to prevent mould. Hulling the parchment while the bean is still soft and damp is difficult, and the pressure in the hulling chamber increases the risk of bruised beans. In the Mandheling coffee region around Lake Toba, farmers pulp the cherries by hand on the day of harvest, ferment the beans overnight, wash them, and sun-dry the parchment for between half a day and two days before selling it, still wet, to local traders. The traders hull the parchment at 40–45 percent moisture using modified Engelberg hullers, and the exposed beans are then sun-dried for three to five days to 14–17 percent moisture before exporters dry them further to about 13 percent. The cup produced this way is characterized by low acidity, heavy body, and spicy, earthy and fruity notes. Because the coffee is handled wet for longer than in other methods, and wet parchment is sometimes stored for days or weeks before hulling, the process carries a risk of mold growth. A 2005 study of Mandheling coffee found Aspergillus molds on stored wet parchment and detected ochratoxin A in five of 42 samples, at levels well below the European Union limit.

== Milling ==
Structure of coffee berry and beans: 1. center cut; 2. bean (endosperm); 3. silver skin (testa, epidermis); 4. parchment (hull, endocarp); 5. pectin layer; 6. pulp (mesocarp); 7. outer skin (pericarp, exocarp)

The final steps in coffee processing involve removing the last layers of dry skin and remaining fruit residue from the now-dry coffee, and cleaning and sorting it. Wet- and dry-processed coffee alike go through them, usually at a dedicated plant and not long before export; the International Coffee Organization calls this stage curing. In the trade they are more often called dry milling, as against the wet milling that precedes drying. These stages are a substantial part of what it costs to get coffee to port: less than 60 per cent of the free-on-board export price reaches the grower, the balance covering in-country transport, warehousing, and wet and dry milling.

=== Hulling ===
The first step in dry milling is the removal of what is left of the fruit from the bean, whether it is the crumbly parchment skin of wet-processed coffee, the parchment skin and dried mucilage of semi-dry-processed coffee, or the entire dry, leathery fruit covering of the dry-processed coffee. Hulling machines work either by rubbing the beans against one another and against the metal parts of the machine, or by tearing the covering as the coffee is forced against the sharp edge of a blade or a screen hole. Some hullers raise the temperature of the coffee as they work and are known as hot hullers; others do not. Physical damage to the beans depends above all on how dry the coffee is: below 12 per cent moisture it increases sharply, producing chipped and broken beans and a greater proportion of the malformed fragments the trade calls "ears" and "triangles".

=== Polishing ===
This is an optional process in which any silver skin that remains on the beans after hulling is removed. Polishing works by friction, the beans rubbing against each other and against the machine, and some hullers polish in the same pass. It improves the appearance of the green beans and reduces chaff, a byproduct of roasting, but it carries costs. The friction generates heat, and overheating during hulling and polishing damages quality and loses weight; it is harder to control than overheating during drying, and arises from excessive pressure at the outlet gates, worn friction parts and screens, or blunt knives. The processing engineer Carlos Brando therefore advises keeping silver-skin removal and polishing to the minimum the market will accept, so that lower pressures can be used, and notes that unpolished coffee weighs 0.5 to 0.7 per cent more than polished coffee. Robusta cannot be polished at a moisture content of 12 per cent, where attempts to remove the silver skin damage the beans. The International Trade Centre treats polishing as optional and does not recommend it for arabica.

=== Cleaning and sorting ===
Air cleaning removes dust, husk fragments and other light material, after which the beans are sorted by size, by density and by color. Size is separated first, on flat screens or on rotating cylindrical ones, because both density and color sorting work faster and more precisely on beans of uniform size. The same operation divides the crop by shape as well, separating the ordinary flat beans, which grow two to a cherry, from the rounded peaberries that form where a cherry carries a single seed; peaberries are around a tenth of a typical crop, and between 5 and 20 per cent in a few areas.

Density is separated by two kinds of machine. A catador is a tall, narrow column through which air is blown or drawn upward: light and defective material is carried up to a point where the column widens, and the drop in pressure lets it fall into a second column and out, while the heavier sound beans descend and leave at the bottom. A gravity or densimetric separator instead vibrates the beans across a sloping perforated deck with air passing through it, the densest working to one side and the lightest to the other, leaving a mixed middle fraction that has to be run through again. Gravity separators have largely displaced catadors, being both more accurate and less power-hungry, though catadors are still placed immediately after the hullers, where they are unmatched for stripping out husk and other light debris.

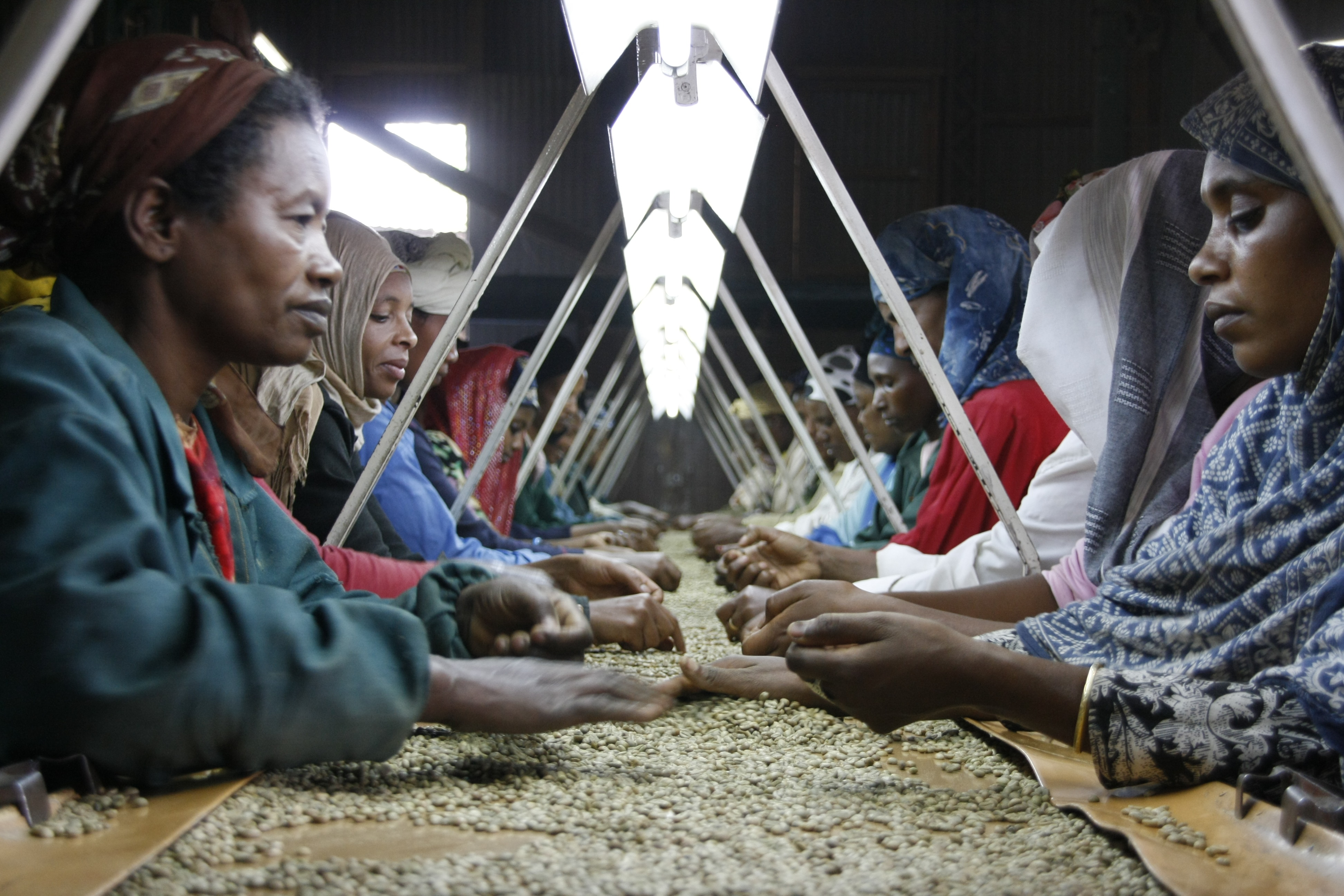
Ethiopian women sort coffee beans at a long table.

The last step is color sorting, which separates defective beans from sound ones by appearance rather than by size or weight. It may be done by hand, teams of workers picking discolored beans out of the stream, or optically by machine.

Optical sorters pass a stream of beans one at a time in front of sensors calibrated to detect defective beans by brightness or color, and a jet of compressed air ejects each rejected bean from the stream. Machines work best on beans that have already been graded by size and density. Whether the final sorting is done by hand or by machine depends largely on the cost of labor. Hand sorting "is still performed in a few countries in order to maintain employment or because labor is still inexpensive", according to the processing engineer Carlos Brando, while the coffee writer Kenneth Davids describes electronic sorters as essential where wages are high, as in Brazil and Hawaii.

The labor saving can be large. In a study of hill-tribe coffee in northern Thailand, replacing manual sorting of coffee cherries with an optical sorter raised throughput from 25 to 37.5 kilograms per worker-hour to 150 to 500 kilograms per hour per machine, and cut the labor cost of sorting by roughly three quarters. In the primary processing factories of Ethiopia and Tanzania, the final hand-picking of discolored beans is done by women. A 2021 review of occupational dust exposure in these factories found that the hand pickers were less exposed than the male production workers, but still had higher dust exposure and more respiratory symptoms than unexposed controls.

=== Grading ===
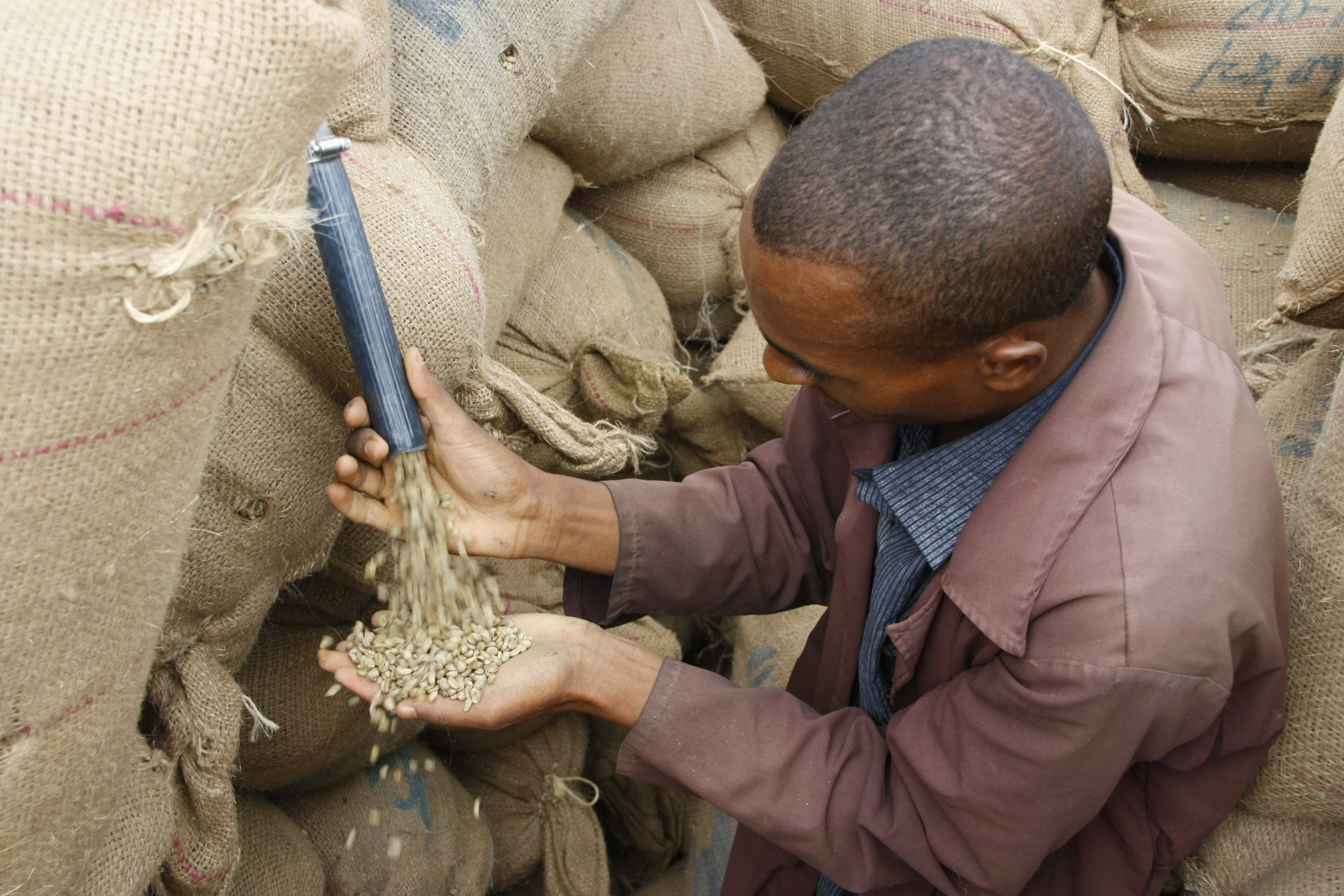
A man takes a sample of coffee beans from bags in an Ethiopian warehouse for grading.

Grading sorts green coffee into commercial categories by criteria that differ from one producing country to another: the size of the bean, the altitude at which it grew, the way it was picked and prepared, the number of defective beans in a sample, and how it tastes when brewed (cup quality). Screen size and defect count are the two measures a quality-control laboratory relies on most. Beans are graded over perforated plates whose apertures are measured in sixty-fourths of an inch, most green coffee falling between screens 12 and 19, and nearly all coffee for export is graded so as to exclude the largest and smallest beans along with the broken ones. Screen numbers correspond to standard apertures — screen 16 is 6.30 millimetres and screen 18 is 7.10 — and a grade may be given as a number, as a letter such as arabica AA, or as a description such as bold, medium or small bean. Some countries use slotted screens with oblong slits, usually 4 or 4.5 millimetres wide, to separate out the peaberries. The purpose is to produce homogeneous commercial lots that meet defined quality criteria and to allow fair pricing. Defects are usually divided into primary or type one defects, which have a significant effect on the cup, and secondary or type two defects, whose effect is minor. Preparation grades describe how thoroughly a lot has been cleaned, and their thresholds are set nationally rather than universally: in El Salvador, European Preparation permits at most six defects per 300 grams against American Preparation's twelve, while in Guatemala European Preparation requires beans above screen 15 with no more than eight defects per 300 grams, and American Preparation beans above screen 14 with as many as twenty-three. Under the Specialty Coffee Association's standards a 350-gram sample is graded, and coffee containing any category one defect cannot be classed as specialty grade.

== Other steps ==
=== Aging ===
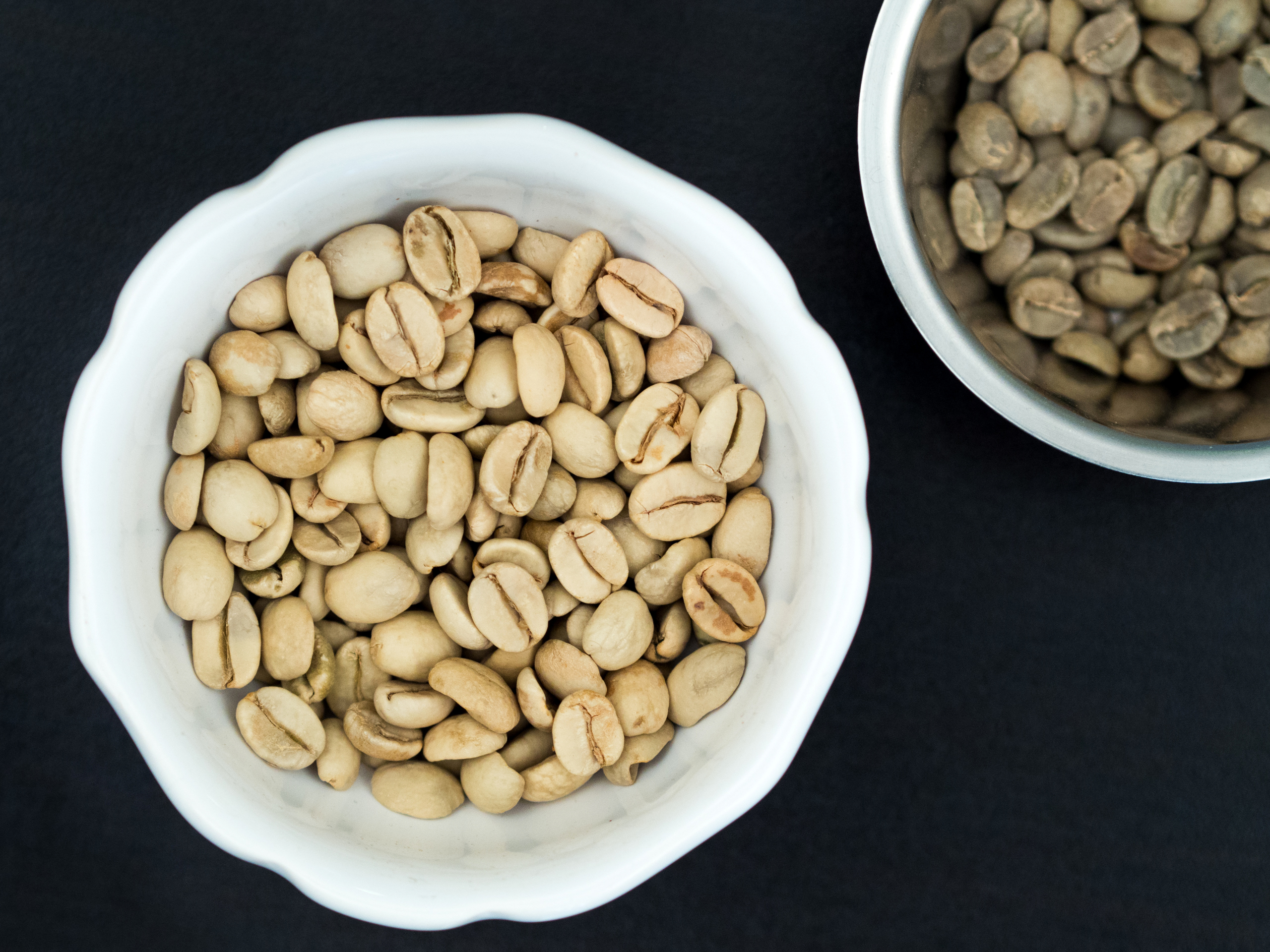
Monsooned Malabar arabica, an "aged" green bean from India, compared with the much darker Yirgachefe beans from Ethiopia

All coffee when it was introduced in Europe came from the port of Mokha in what is now Yemen. Importing the beans to Europe required a lengthy sea voyage around the Horn of Africa, which ultimately changed the coffee's flavor due to age and exposure to saline air. Coffee later spread to India and Indonesia but still required a long sea voyage. Once the Suez Canal was opened, shipment time to Europe was greatly reduced and coffee with flavor less affected by salt and age began arriving. This fresher coffee was, to some degree, rejected as Europeans had not developed a taste for unaged coffee. To meet the demand for aged coffee, some product was aged in large, open-sided warehouses at port for six or more months in an attempt to expose the coffee to the same conditions that shipments used to require.

India's Monsooned Malabar coffee is the surviving commercial form of this effect. According to the account given in The Craft and Science of Coffee, a consignment shipped from the Malabar Coast to Scandinavia in about 1850 spent more than six months at sea, and the beans absorbed moisture through the ship's wooden holds on the passage round the Cape of Good Hope; they swelled, roughly doubled in size, lost weight, turned from blue-grey to a creamy golden yellow, and arrived tasting quite different. Scandinavian buyers acquired a taste for them. When faster shipping and better packing later removed the effect, those buyers complained that the coffee was wrong, and an Indian investigation established that the change had happened during the voyage. The process was then reproduced deliberately on the west coast of India, producing the monsooned Malabar and Basanally coffees, which India launched on the international market in 1972. The Coffee Board of India describes the result as a yellowed bean of reduced acidity, with a heavy, syrupy character reminiscent of aged coffee.

Monsooning is now carried out between June and October, when the southwest monsoon reaches the west coast. Selected large-bean natural coffees are spread in a thick layer on the floor of a well-ventilated warehouse and raked regularly for over a week in the moist, salt-laden wind; once they have swollen and paled, they are bagged, stacked in rows and exposed for a further week, then spread out again, the cycle repeating until the beans reach the golden colour that marks the finished product. They end at around 13 to 14 per cent moisture — high enough that mould would normally be expected. The authors note that no such damage occurs, but describe the explanation, that salt from the seawater acts as a preservative, as presumed rather than scientifically established.

In the specialty-coffee trade, by contrast, newly arrived green coffee, known as fresh crop or new crop, is generally taken to be at its best: its flavours mute and its aromas become less lively over the following months, though some coffees hold their character for fourteen to sixteen months. Fats and oils make up about 15 per cent of the weight of a green bean and are degraded by exposure to oxygen, while an enzyme, polyphenol oxidase, reacts with oxygen and polyphenols to form brown pigments, so that the coffee loses its brightness.

=== By-products ===
Almost all of the harvested cherry leaves the mill as something other than coffee, and the residues are chemically awkward as well as bulky: alongside proteins, sugars and pectin they carry tannins, caffeine and other phenolic compounds that are toxic to plants, to aquatic life and to humans, which is what has limited their straightforward use as animal feed or fertilizer.

Which residues appear depends on the method. Wet processing yields pulp, mucilage and parchment; dry processing yields husk. The silver skin is released only at roasting, so it accumulates at roasting plants rather than at the mill, at about eight kilograms for every tonne of roasted coffee. Wastewater is peculiar to the wet method, and small mills have been reported using anywhere between 2.3 and 23 cubic metres of water for each tonne of cherry processed; the effluent is acidic and heavily loaded with organic matter and nutrients.

Much of this material is not treated at all. The commonest uses on the farm or at the mill are composting the pulp into fertilizer, mixing it into livestock feed, spreading it on steep ground to check erosion, and burning dried husk or parchment as cooking or heating fuel. Large quantities nonetheless go untreated, mucilage has no reported management method of its own, and open burning and dumping remain common. Husk left in the fields can salinize or acidify the soil and cause eutrophication in nearby water.

A large research literature has examined turning these residues into something of value. Routes already in use include anaerobic digestion of the pulp for biogas, husk and parchment as fuel, as a briquette binder and as an additive in bricks and ceramics, husk as a substrate for mushroom cultivation and as a raw material for particle board, and the silver skin as a precursor for activated carbon. The husk's high content of fermentable sugars has also made it a candidate for ethanol production. The authors of a 2025 review argue that these remain low-value uses, and that no framework or regulation yet exists to move the sector towards closing the loop.

=== Decaffeination ===
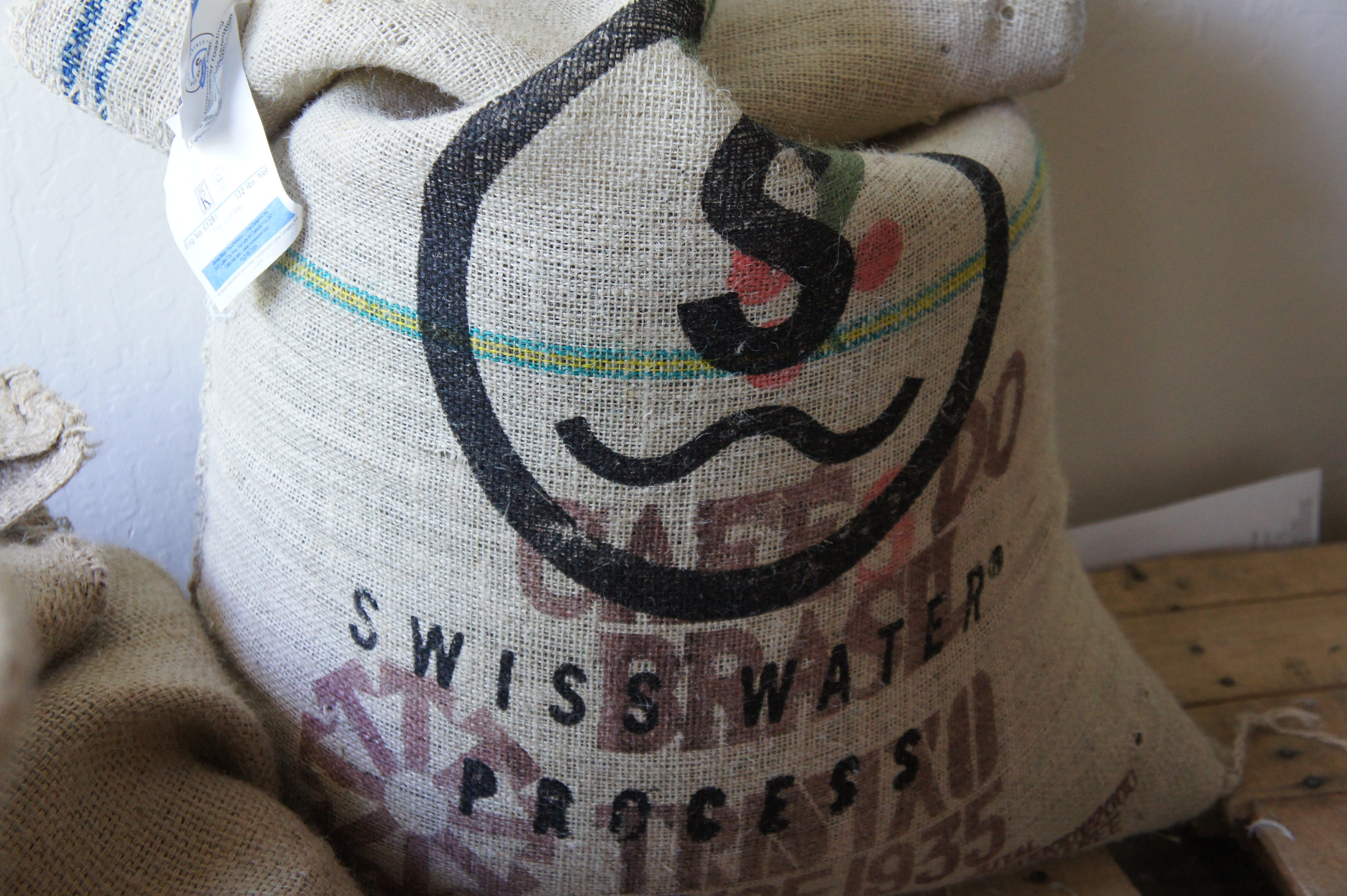
Green coffee beans decaffeinated by the Swiss Water process, in a 130-pound sack

Caffeine is removed while the beans are still green, before they are roasted. Four kinds of process are in use: extraction with water, extraction with organic solvents, extraction with supercritical carbon dioxide, and biological methods that use enzymes or microbes.

Water decaffeination begins by extracting the beans with hot water. The caffeine is taken out of that liquid on an adsorbent, usually activated carbon, though polymers, molecular sieves, silica, resin and zeolite are also used. The stripped extract still carries the coffee's aroma and flavor compounds, and it is returned to the beans. In the variant known as the Swiss Water process the caffeine-free extract becomes the solvent for the next batch, so that caffeine leaves the fresh beans by diffusing down its own concentration gradient. No hazardous chemical is involved, but carbohydrates and flavor compounds come out along with the caffeine.

Solvent processes are either direct or indirect. In the direct kind the solvent meets the beans themselves. In the indirect kind it is applied to an aqueous coffee extract, and the decaffeinated extract is then soaked back into the beans; this route is favored in parts of Europe, particularly Germany. Many solvents have been used, among them acetone, benzene, chloroform, ethanol, diethyl ether and dichloromethane, which can take out as much as 99 per cent of the caffeine in green beans. Trichloroethylene is no longer permitted, because it is carcinogenic. The commonest of these processes is direct extraction with ethyl acetate, sold as "natural decaffeination"; it is carried out with steaming over about 24 hours, and the solvent is recovered by distillation. Vegetable oils have also been used, because the oleic acid in them is more selective for caffeine than other fatty acids.

Carbon dioxide becomes supercritical above 31 °C and 7.39 MPa. The beans are wetted, steamed or soaked first, then extracted. Spent carbon dioxide is regenerated by washing it with water under pressure, by membrane separation, or by adsorption on activated carbon. Plants normally run semi-continuously, with the gas passing through a fixed bed of beans, which gives the coffee a long residence time in the vessel and the solvent a short one. In a 1995 survey the United States Environmental Protection Agency described a supercritical process operating at around 4,000 psi (28 MPa) and between 90 and 100 °C (194 and 212 °F), removing about 97 per cent of the caffeine. Decaffeinated beans retain roughly 0.1 per cent caffeine on a dry basis. Not every roasting plant decaffeinates its own coffee; many buy green beans that have already been treated.

Biological decaffeination uses proteases such as papain from papaya and bromelain from pineapple, or microbes including Pseudomonas and Aspergillus species, which metabolize caffeine by demethylation and use it as a source of carbon and nitrogen. It has not been developed commercially. The enzymes are unstable, they need cofactors, and the inhibition chemistry is complicated.

No process removes caffeine alone. Reported effects on chlorogenic acid content run in both directions: studies have found large decreases, no significant change, and small increases, depending on bean size, temperature, treatment time and, in supercritical extraction, pressure. One study of beans decaffeinated with dichloromethane found total diterpenes down by 59 per cent in arabica and 32 per cent in canephora, and tocopherols lower as well; both are fat-soluble and are taken up by the solvent. Sensory panels have generally not separated decaffeinated from ordinary coffee on flavor or aroma, though the aroma compounds differ, with ordinary coffee richer in pyrazines and decaffeinated coffee in furans.

== Storage ==
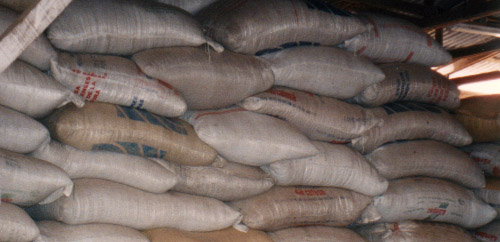
Green coffee stored in bags

Green coffee is stored at several points along the supply chain, from parchment held on the farm after drying to green beans waiting at the roasting facility. The International Trade Centre recommends 11 per cent moisture on a wet basis, at cool temperatures. Wetter coffee is more prone to molds and to the metabolic activity that degrades quality. Drier coffee deteriorates faster and breaks more readily at the dry mill. Coffee is also hygroscopic, exchanging moisture with the surrounding air until the two reach equilibrium, so a relative humidity of 60 to 65 per cent is generally recommended.

Jute bags are traditional, and are used because they let moisture escape and so reduce the risk of mold. Coffee held in larger bulk bags varies more in moisture content and picks up odors more readily. Higher-value coffee is increasingly kept in high-barrier packaging instead. Whatever the packaging, the guide recommends leaving room for air to circulate between the stack and the walls and ceiling, and keeping the coffee off the ground on pallets or a moisture barrier. Temperature changes where the bags touch a surface can drive moisture into them even when the packaging blocks it directly.

== Roasting ==
Although not considered part of the processing pipeline proper, nearly all coffee sold to consumers throughout the world is sold as roasted coffee in general one of three degrees of roasting: light, medium, and dark. Packaging may use more specific trade names, which from light to dark include blonde or cinnamon roast, city roast, full city roast, Vienna roast, French roast and Italian roast. Consumers can also elect to buy unroasted coffee to be roasted at home. Green coffee can also be used for the preparation of infusions or ingested as ground powder, but this is of limited relevance to the global coffee market.
