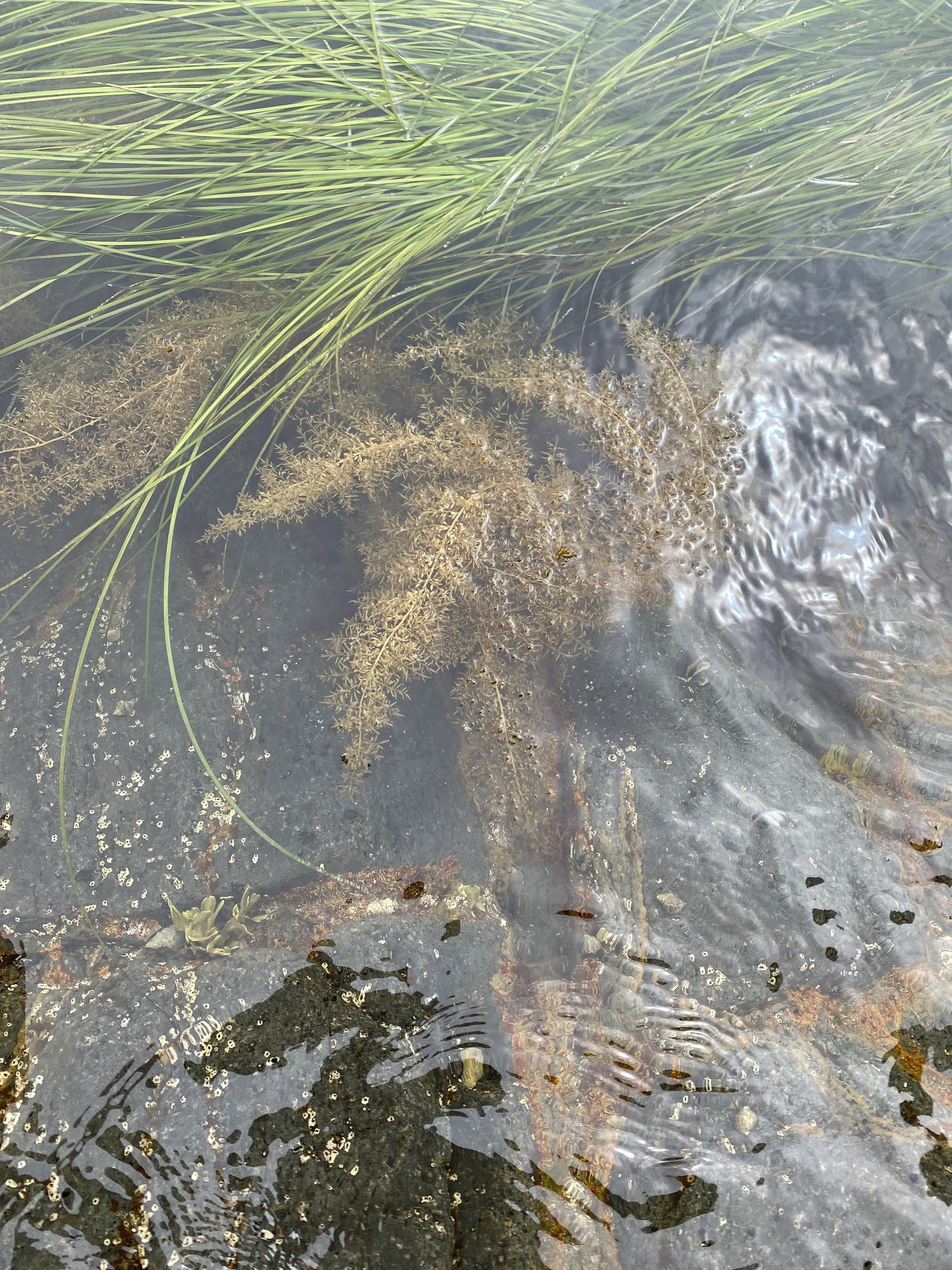

Scientific classification
- Domain: Eukaryota
- Clade: Diaphoretickes
- Clade: SAR
- Clade: Stramenopiles
- Phylum: Gyrista
- Subphylum: Ochrophytina
- Class: Phaeophyceae
- Order: Fucales
- Family: Sargassaceae
- Genus: Sargassum
- Species: S. miyabei

Binomial name
- Sargassum miyabei Yendo, 1907

Synonyms
- Sargassum kjellmanianum Yendo, 1907; Sargassum miyabei var. okiense Kajimura, 1993

= Sargassum miyabei =

Species of seaweed

Sargassum miyabei is a species of seaweed native to East Asia and Southeast Asia, from eastern Russia and Japan to Vietnam and the Philippines. It belongs to the subgenus Bactrophycus, section Teretia of the genus Sargassum.
