= Karl Wilhelm (botanist) =

German botanist and mycologist

Karl Adolf Wilhelm (1848–1933) was a German botanist and mycologist.
