= Coffee production in Rwanda =

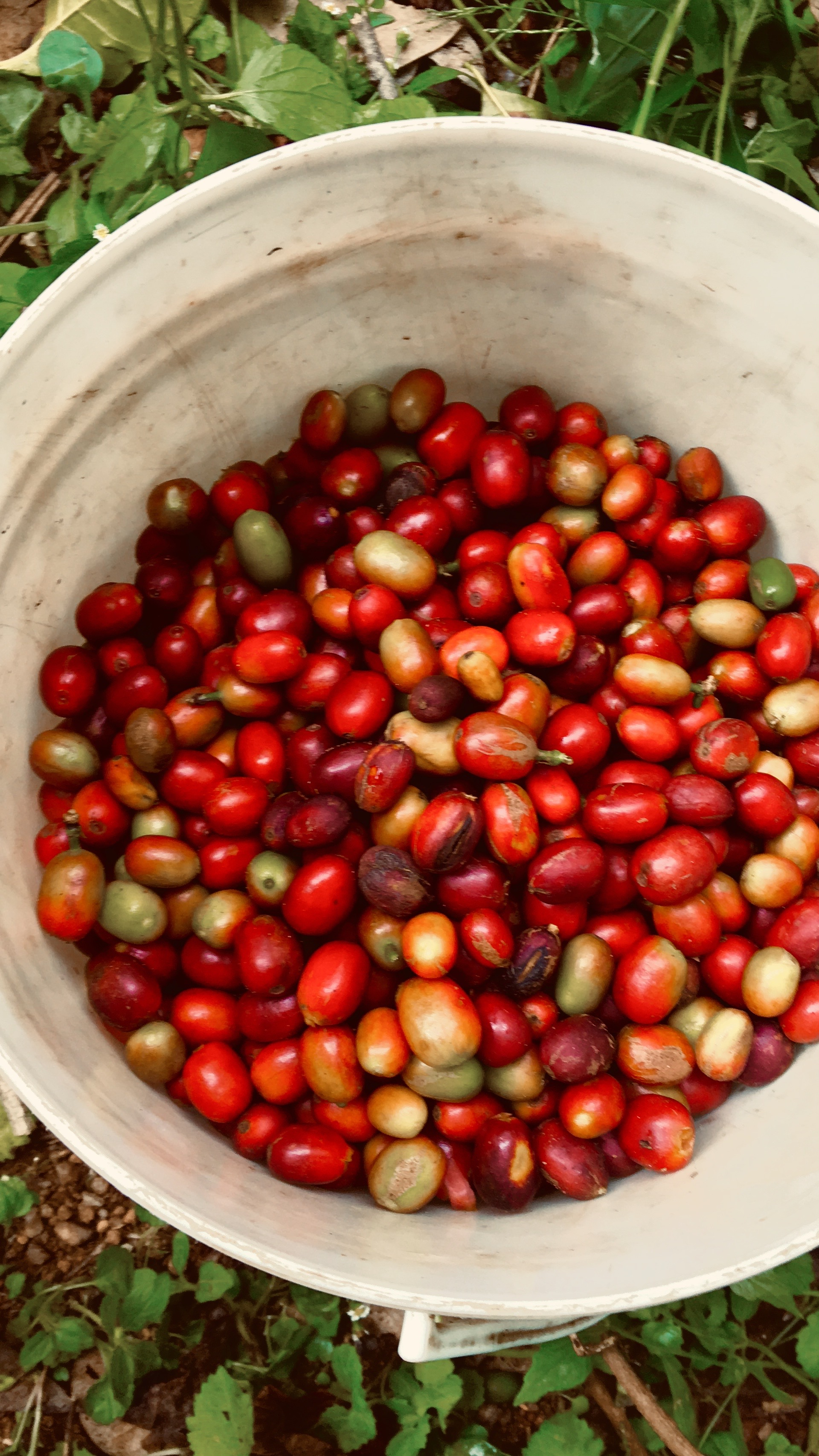
Rwandan coffee beans

Coffee production in Rwanda plays a significant role in the country's economy and agricultural sector. Known for its Arabica coffee, Rwanda has emerged as a notable player in the global coffee industry.

== History and background ==
Coffee was first introduced to the country in the early 1900s by the Germans. Under Belgian colonial rule, coffee production became compulsory.

After the 1994 Rwandan genocide, the Partnership for Enhancing Agriculture in Rwanda through Linkages worked to rebuild the economy through expansion into the coffee industry. From 2001 to 2006, USAID invested $10 million into coffee washing stations and farmer training.

== Cultivation practices ==
Rwandan coffee is predominantly grown at high altitudes, benefiting from favorable climate conditions and volcanic soil. Farmers use traditional techniques such as hand-picking of ripe coffee cherries, sun drying, and meticulous sorting.

Annually, Rwanda produces between 20,000 and 22,000 metric tons of coffee. As of 2025, 97% of coffee produced was arabica, primarily bourbon coffee, and 3% was robusta.

== Economic impact ==
Coffee production has a significant economic impact on Rwanda, particularly rural communities. In 2025, there were 400,000 coffee smallholdings in Rwanda.

Between 2017 and 2023, coffee exports generated $452 million. Major importers of Rwandan coffee include the United States, Switzerland, the United Kingdom, Belgium, and Singapore. Domestic consumption comprises less than 20 percent of the coffee grown. Rwandan coffee is primarily exported as raw green beans and roasted in other countries, with Rwanda's first roasted bean exports occurring in April 2018.

In 2018, the Rwandan government partnered with the Chinese e-commerce platform Alibaba, increasing Rwandan coffee sales through business-to-consumer models.

== Sustainability efforts ==
Various organizations, cooperatives, and government agencies promote practices such as shade-grown coffee, ensuring fair prices for farmers, and enhancing social development in coffee-growing regions. Rwanda's coffee sector prioritizes traceability in the coffee supply chain.

== See also ==
- Coffee production in Kenya
- Coffee production in Uganda
- Coffee production in Tanzania
- Coffee production in Ethiopia
