= Smallholding =

Small farm, often for a single family

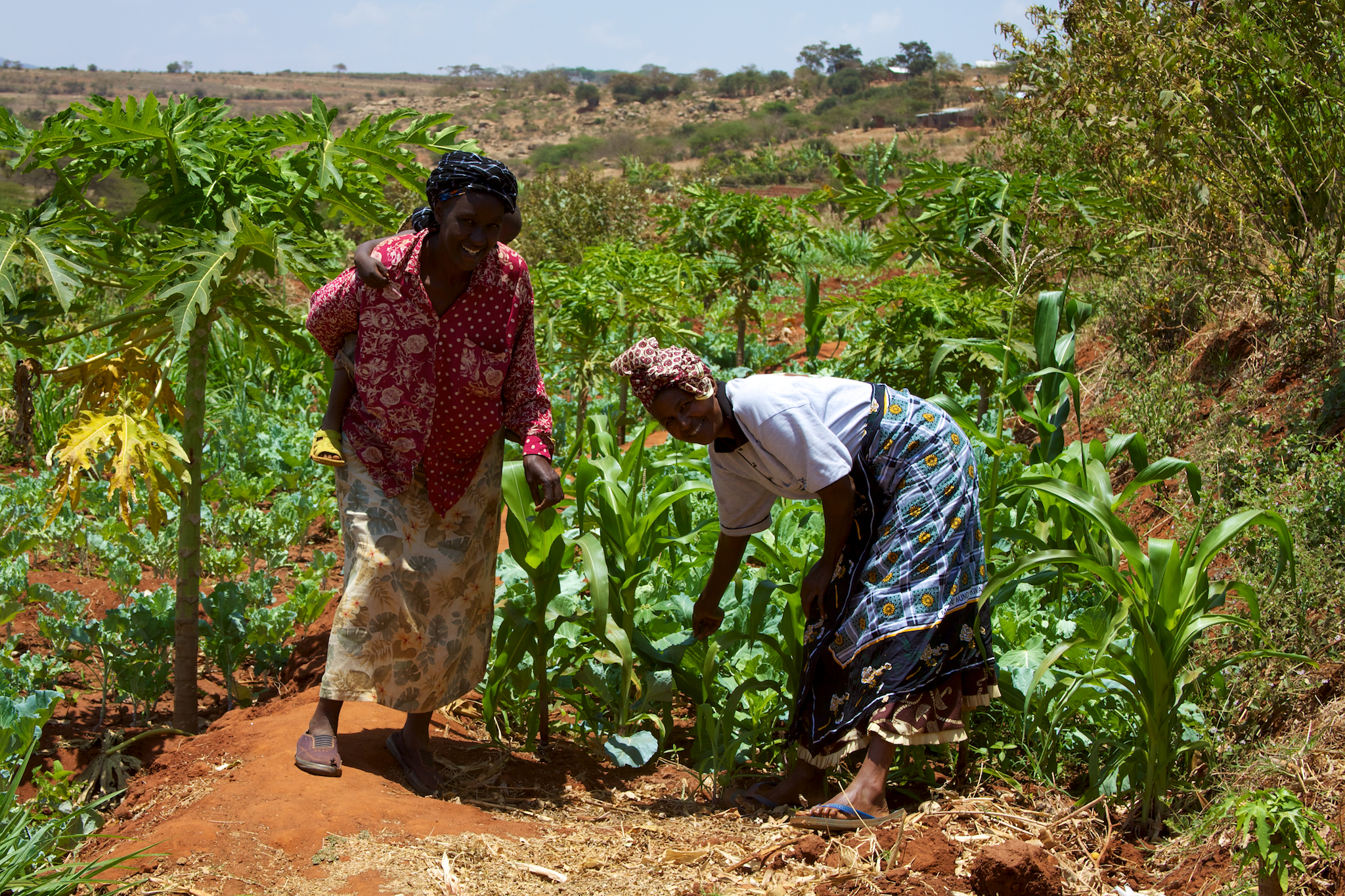
Female smallholder farmers in Kenya. In many parts of Africa and other parts of the world, women are the primary smallholders. In many contexts, women face unequal access to land, markets, knowledge, and other assets needed to maintain their farms.

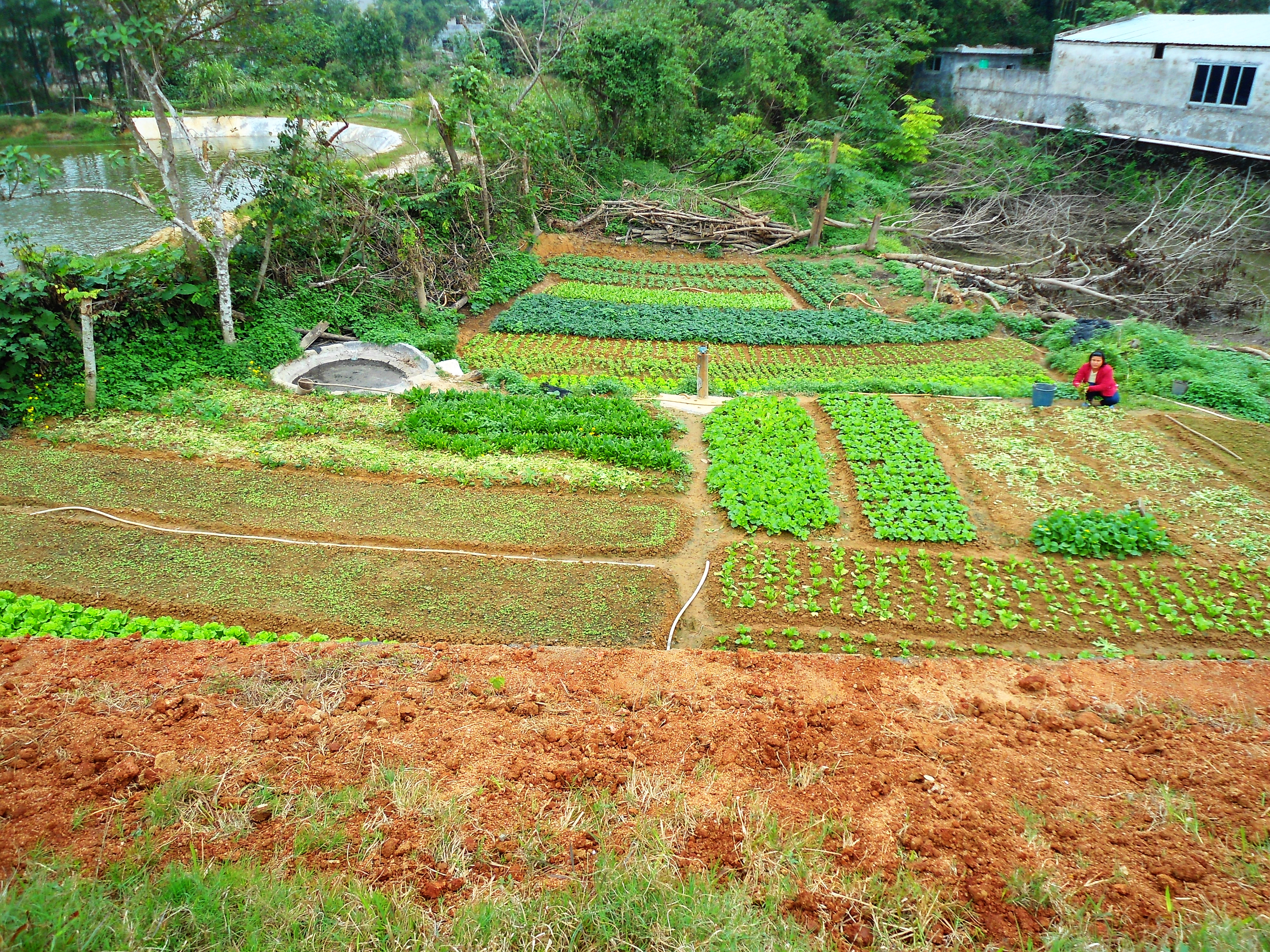
Small vegetable farm in Hainan, China

A smallholding is a small farm operating under a small-scale agriculture model and managed by a smallholder. Definitions vary widely for what constitutes a smallholder or small-scale farm, including factors such as size, food production technique or technology, involvement of family in labor and economic impact. It 2013 there were an estimated 500 million smallholder farms in developing countries of the world alone, supporting almost two billion people. Smallholdings are usually farms supporting a single family with a mixture of cash crops and subsistence farming. As a country becomes more affluent, smallholdings may not be self-sufficient. Still, they may be valued for providing supplemental sustenance, recreation, and general rural lifestyle appreciation (often as hobby farms). As the sustainable food and local food movements grow in affluent countries, some of these smallholdings are gaining increased economic viability in the developed world as well.

Small-scale agriculture is often in tension with industrial agriculture, which finds efficiencies by increasing outputs, monoculture, consolidating land under big agricultural operations, and economies of scale. Certain labor-intensive cash crops, such as cocoa production in Ghana or Côte d'Ivoire, rely heavily on smallholders; globally, as of 2008, 90% of cocoa is grown by smallholders. These farmers rely on cocoa for up to 60 to 90 per cent of their income. Similar trends in supply chains exist in other crops like coffee, palm oil, and bananas. In other markets, small scale agriculture can increase food system investment in small holders improving food security. Today, some companies attempt to include smallholdings into their value chain, providing seeds, feed, or fertilizers to improve production.

Because smallholding farms frequently require less industrial inputs and can be an important way to improve food security and sustainable food systems in less-developed contexts, addressing the productivity and financial sustainability of smallholders is an international development priority and is measured by indicator 2.3 of Sustainable Development Goal 2. Additionally, since agriculture has such large impacts on climate change, Project Drawdown described "Sustainable Intensification for Smallholders" as an important method for climate change mitigation.

Farm size vary widely by region. In 2025 Latin America and the Caribbean had only 3% of farms because holdings are generally large; in Asia and Africa, smallhold farms of 2 to 50 ha worked around half the farmland; and in Europe, the Americas and Oceania, farms exceeding 1 000 ha controlled the greater part of farmland.

The crops produced by small-hold farmers contributed in 2025 approximately 16% of global dietary energy, 12% of proteins, and 9% of fats derived from crops. Their contribution was significant for certain crop types: farms smaller than 5 ha produce almost 50% of global stimulants, spices and aromatic crops, while contributing between 20% – 30% of cereals, fruits and vegetables.

== Issues ==
=== Productivity ===
According to conventional theory, economies of scale allow agricultural productivity, in terms of inputs versus outputs, to rise as the size of the farm rises. Specialization has also been a major factor in increasing agricultural productivity, for example as commodity processing began to move off the farm in the 19th century, farmers could spend more effort on primary food production.

Although numerous studies show that larger farms are more productive than smaller ones, some writers state that whilst conventional farming creates a high output per worker, some small-scale, sustainable, polyculture farmers can produce more food per acre of land.

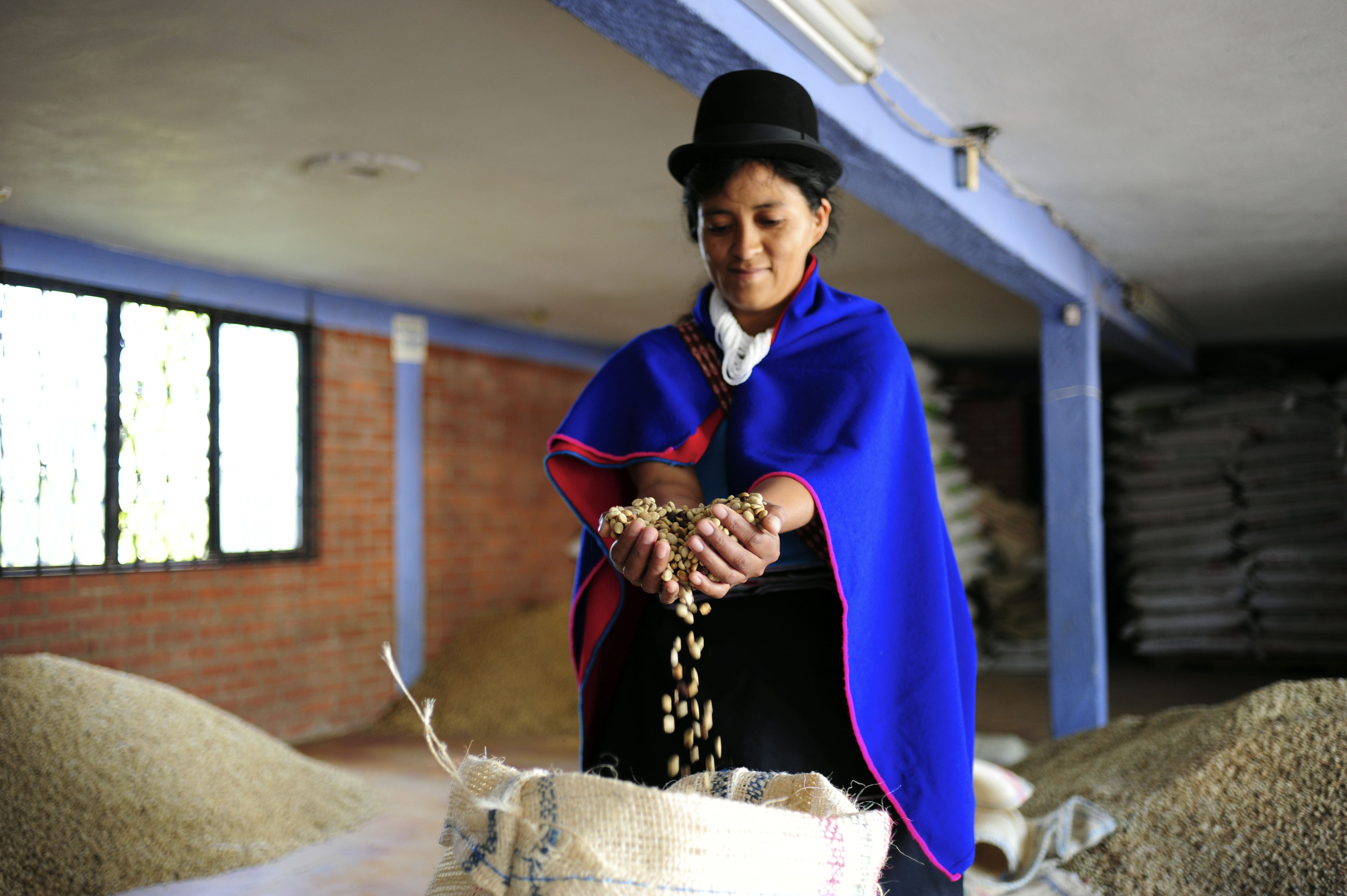
A smallholder coffee farmer in Colombia contributing her coffee to an agricultural cooperative. Cooperatives give small farmers an opportunity to be more competitive in markets, especially markets like coffee and cocoa where many of the purchasers are large businesses with high market power.

Small farms have some economic advantages. Farmers support the local economy of their communities. An American study showed that small farms with incomes of $100,000 or less spend almost 95 percent of their farm-related expenses within their local communities. The same study took into comparison the fact that farms with incomes greater than $900,000 spend less than 20 percent of their farm-related expenses in the local economy.

Small-scale agriculture often sells products directly to consumers. Disintermediation gives the farmer the profit that would otherwise go to the wholesaler, the distributor, and the supermarket. About two-thirds of the revenue is expended on product marketing. If farmers sell their products directly to consumers, they receive a higher percentage of the retail price, although they will spend more time selling the same amounts of product, which is an opportunity cost.

=== Food security ===
Because smallholding farms frequently require less industrial inputs and can be an important way to improve food security in less-developed contexts, addressing the productivity and financial sustainability of small holders is an international development priority and measured by indicator 2.3 of Sustainable Development Goal 2. The International Fund for Agricultural Development has an ongoing program for Adaptation for Smallholder Agriculture.

During the global COVID-19 pandemic, and the attendant disruptions of food systems, their role has become more important.

=== Environmental and climate adaptation ===
While the historical focus on smallholders has been increasing global food supply under climate change and the role played by smallholder communities, climate adaptation efforts are still hindered by lack of information on how smallholder farmers are experiencing and responding to climate change. There is lack of detailed, context-specific information on what climate change portends to smallholder farmers in different and widely varying agroecological environments and socio-economic realities, and what management strategies they are employing to deal with these impacts.

Especially for smallholders working in commodity crops, climate change introduces an increasing amount of variability to farmer economic viability; for example, coffee production globally is under increased threat, and smallholders in East Africa, such as in the Ugandan, Tanzanian or Kenyan industries, are rapidly losing both viable coffee land and productivity of plants.

In some cases, smallholders are an important source of deforestation. For example, smallholders are an important component of the oil palm industry of Southeast Asia, contributing 40% of the production. Because such farmers are less able to access financing than larger businesses, they are unable to fund methods to increase the productivity of their farms when yields decline, increasing their need to clear more land. Increasing productivity, especially amongst smallholder farms, is an important way to decrease the amount of land needed for farming and slow environmental degradation through processes like deforestation.

== Formats ==
The definition of a small farm has varied over time and by country. Agricultural economists have analyzed the distinctions among farm sizes since the field's inception. Traditional agricultural economic theory considered small farms inefficient, a stance that began to be challenged in the 1950s. An overview of research published by the World Bank in 1998 indicated that the productivity of small farms often exceeded that of larger ones.

=== Hobby farms ===
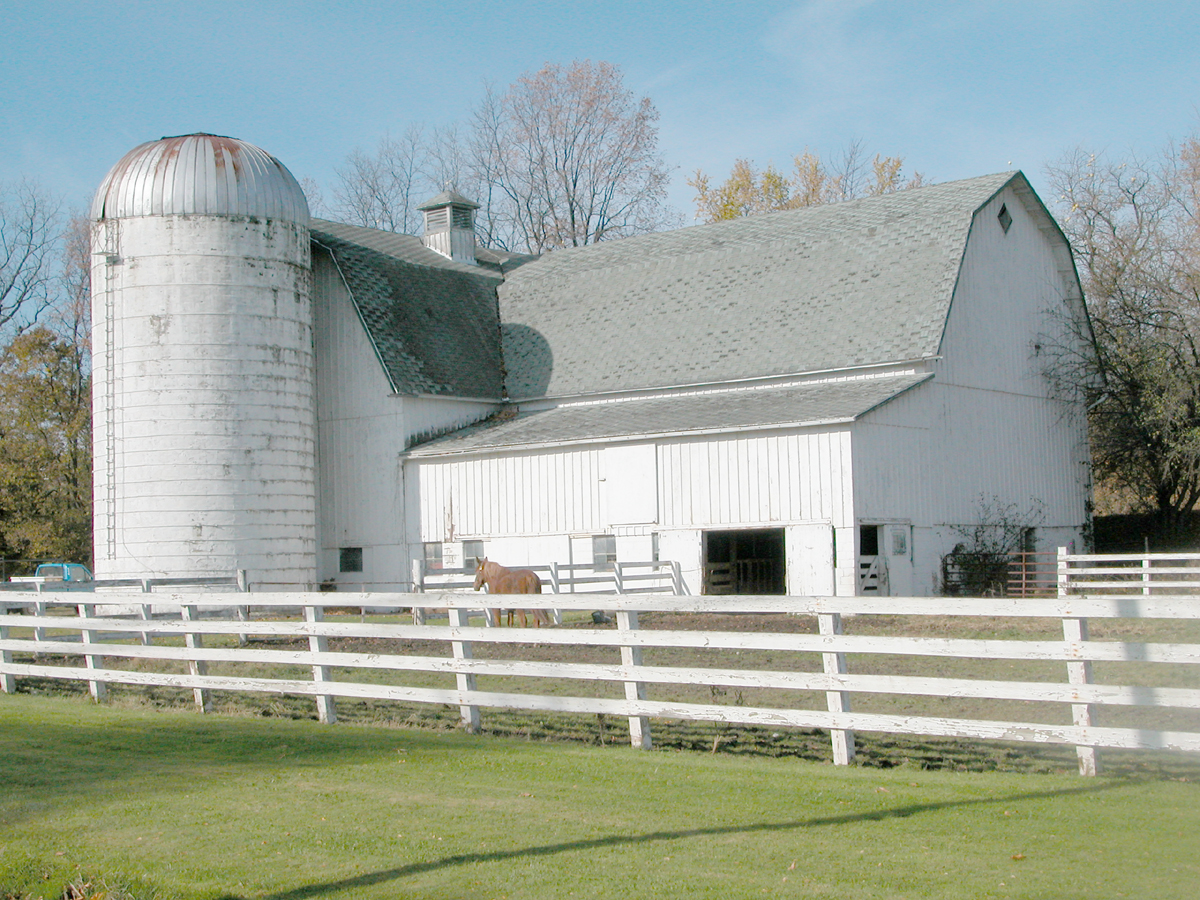
An old dairy farm used as a hobby farm near Leicester, New York

A hobby farm (also called a lifestyle block, acreage living, or rural residential) is a smallholding or small farm that is maintained without expectation of being a primary source of income. Some are held simply to bring homeowners closer to nature, to provide recreational land for horses, or as working farms for secondary income.

=== Nucleus estate and smallholder ===
Nucleus estate and smallholder (NES) is a farming system for commodity crops, often oil palm, practised in different world regions. It is most famous today for its application in the palm oil sector in Indonesia. The nucleus is the part of such a plantation that is under concession and management of the company, while another part of the plantation is operated by smallholders typically on their own land but planted by the company. NES farming is a particular form of contract farming.

=== Croft ===
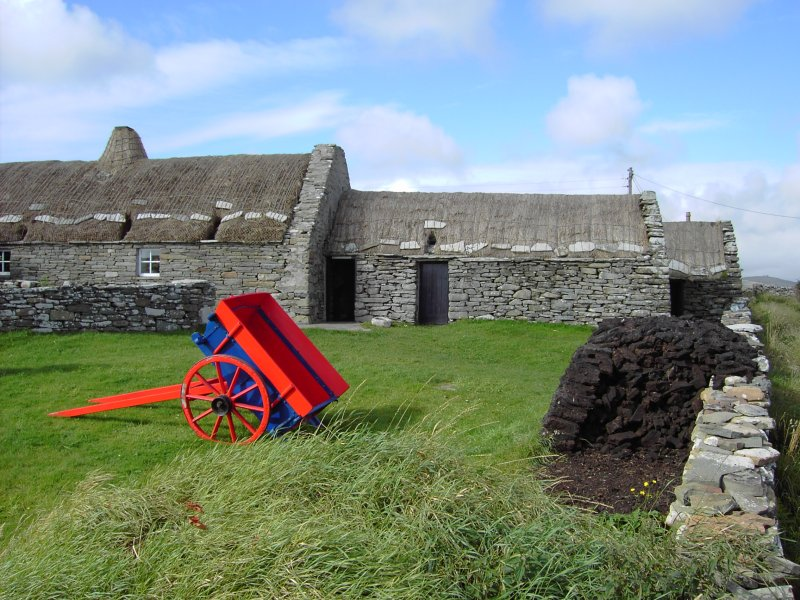
The Shetland Crofthouse Museum at Dunrossness, Shetland, with peat stacked outside

A croft is a traditional Scottish term for a fenced or enclosed area of land. It is usually small and arable, and typically, though not always, includes a crofter's dwelling. A crofter is a person who has tenure and use of the land, typically as a tenant farmer in rural areas.

In Northern England, "crofter" was a term associated with tenant farming and rural employment. For example, in the textiles industry, it referred to someone who bleached cloth prior to dyeing by laying it out in fields known as "crofts".

=== Smallholder Farms ===
Smallholder farms, also known as small-scale farms, encompass a diverse array of agricultural operations, varying from those owning the land they cultivate to those who do not. These farmers, often family-oriented, rely significantly on family labor to meet production needs, with women contributing a substantial portion of farm labor.

The agricultural work on smallholder farms predominantly involves family members, with occasional hired labor, particularly during peak seasons. However, the productivity per area tends to increase with higher involvement of family members in farm activities. In addition to farm-related duties, women on smallholder farms often shoulder responsibilities such as collecting fuel and water and engaging in low-value, small-scale trading activities.

Many smallholder farms supplement their income through off-farm work, crucial for sustaining livelihoods, particularly during agricultural downturns like droughts. Engaging in off-farm employment also serves to build social capital and resilience within these communities. Having multiple sources of income or employment opportunities off the farm contributes to the economic stability of smallholder farming households. These off-farm income-generating activities offer a buffer against agricultural shocks and allow for a diversified livelihood strategy, providing families with increased financial security and access to essential resources.

== Developing countries ==
In many developing countries, smallholding is a small plot of land with low rental value, used to grow crops. By some estimates, there are 525 million smallholder farmers in the world. These farms vary in land sizes, production and labor intensities. The distribution of farm sizes depends on a number of agroecological and demographic conditions, as well as on economic and technological factors. Smallholders are critical to local and regional food systems, as well as livelihoods, and especially so during periods of food supply chain disruptions. Smallholders dominate production in certain key sectors such as coffee and cocoa. Various types of agribusinesses enterprises work with smallholding farmers in a range of roles including buying crops, providing seed, and acting as financial institutions.

In low-income countries, women make up 43 percent of smallholding agricultural labor but produce 60–80 percent of food crops.

=== India ===
In India, there is five sizes classification for smallholders. These are 'marginal' less than 1 hectare (2 1/2 acres), 'small' between 1 and 2 hectares (2 1/2 and 5 acres), 'semi medium' between 2 and 4 hectares (5 and 10 acres), 'medium' between 4 and 10 hectares (9.9 and 24.7 acres), 'large' above 10 hectares (25 acres). If we use 4 hectares (10 acres) (marginal + small + medium) as a threshold, 94.3% of holdings are small and these constitute 65.2% of all farmland. The bulk of India's hungry and poor people are constituted of smallholder farmers and landless people. 78% country's farmers own less than 2 hectares (5 acres), which constitutes 33% of total farmland but at the same time, they produce 41% of the country's food grains. 20% of the world's poor live in India, although the country was self-sufficient in food production in 2002 due to the first Green Revolution started in the latter half of the twentieth century, numerous households lacked resources to purchase food. Holdings less than 2 ha contributed 41% of total food grain production in 1991 compared to 28% in 1971, which means a substantial increase, whereas medium holdings registered a mere 3% increase in the same period and large holdings registered a decline from 51 to 35%. This signifies the importance of smallholders in the Green Revolution and the attainment of national food security. Smallholder families are becoming more vulnerable and more disadvantaged due to the expansion of international trade liberalisation. The needs and aspirations of small farmers must feature prominently in policies of market reform that seek to improve food and nutritional security. India's total increase rate of productivity across the farming sector was far less in 1990's when compared to previous decades.

=== Kenya ===
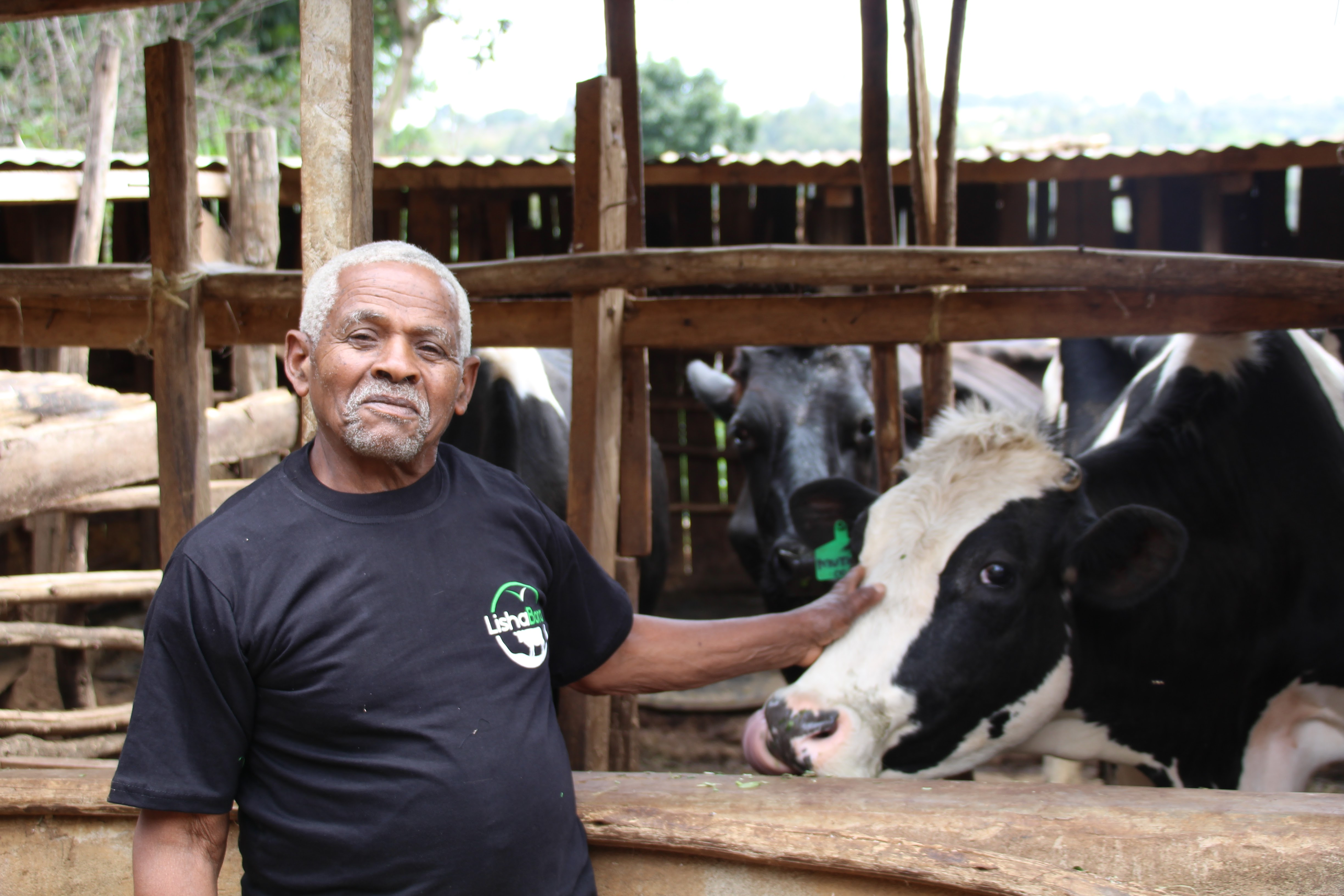
Kenyan smallholder dairy farmer

Kenya's smallholder means someone who owns, possesses or produces agricultural products in small-scale. Smallholder production accounts for 78 percent of total agricultural production and 70 percent of commercial production. The majority of the smallholder population work in farm sizes averaging 0.47 hectares (1 1/4 acres). This represents the vast majority of Kenya's rural poor population who depend on agriculture for their livelihood. Adverse risk events during the period 1980–2012 led to production losses in smallholder farms resulting in a drop in agricultural gross domestic product (GDP) of 2 percent or more. Increasing the productivity of smallholder farmers is encouraged due to its potential to improve food availability, increase rural incomes, lower poverty rates, and grow the economy. Diversification of crops in smallholder farms is one of the potential strategies in sustaining agricultural productivity, and copping with marketing risks. It is also a transitional step from subsistence to commercial agriculture. Age, education of household head, type of crops, cropping system, amount of credit, and irrigation facilities are some of the factors influencing diversification in smallholder farms.

=== Tanzania ===
Along the upper and middle reaches of the Nduruma River in the Pangani River Basin, Tanzania, there is not enough water to go around. Smallholder farmers address inequities in land and water distribution by enforcing existing traditional local rules. Whilst larger estate farms may have governmental licences guaranteeing rights to the water, a study found that those large-scale farms which adhere to the traditional water rights structures fare better in terms of social reputation, which better ensures their access to water. Adhering to the water law to enforce their permits is less effective, as regional Tanzanian local governments generally attempt to avoid conflict with their populace. On a larger scale, however, existing traditional rules are ineffective in maintaining cooperation among users along the Nduruma River.

=== Thailand ===
In 1975, there were 4.2 million smallholder farming households in Thailand. In 2013, Thailand had 5.9 million smallholder farming households. The average area of these smallholdings had shrunk from 3.7 to 3.2 hectares (9 1/4 to 8 acres) over that period. Instead of farms getting larger and less numerous, as has been the case in the Global North, the reverse happened: they got smaller and more numerous.

== United States ==
Several definitions of small farm have been formulated in legislation. In 1977 the US Congress, via the Food and Agriculture Act of 1977, defined a small farm as one with sales under $20,000. At the time these comprised 70% of farms in the US. The Act sponsored additional research on small farming operations by US land grant universities and their extension services and mandated that an annual report on these activities be issued by the US Secretary of Agriculture. A 1997 study by the United States Small Farms Commission defined small farms as those with less than $250,000 in gross receipts annually on which day-to-day labor and management are provided by the farmer and/or the farm family that owns the production, or owns or leases the productive assets. In 2000, such farms accounted for about 90% of the more than 2.1 million U.S. farms, but only about 40% of U.S. farm production.

The concentration of production on fewer and larger operations is a longstanding concern among some segments of the agricultural community. Others view these changes as inevitable, and even necessary to maintain the efficiency and competitiveness of the sector.

Farm typology analysis by the USDA Economic Research Service divides the small family farm category into five groups:

1. limited-resource farms;
2. retirement farms;
3. residential/lifestyle farms;
4. farming occupation/lower-sales,
5. farming occupation/high-sales.

=== Technology for small farmers ===
Many farmers are upset by their inability to fix the new types of high-tech farm equipment. This is due mostly to companies using intellectual property law to prevent farmers from having the legal right to fix their equipment (or gain access to the information to allow them to do it). This has encouraged groups such as Open Source Ecology and Farm Hack to begin to make open-source agricultural machinery.

== European Union ==
The debate concerning the role of small farms within the European Union is ongoing. The European Commission states that more than three-quarters of farm holdings in the European Union are less than 10 hectares (25 acres), with a large number less than five hectares (12 acres). However as of 2009 it had not established a formal definition of the term that could be used in its Common Agricultural Policy. The public perception of the possible benefits of small-scale farming has led to requests for further studies from the European Commission.

== See also ==
- Allotment (gardening)
- Asset-based community development
- Building-integrated agriculture
- Croft
- Family farm
- Foodscaping
- Forest gardening
- Hobby farm
- Market garden
- Peasant
- Permaculture
- Subsistence agriculture
- Underground farming
- Urban agriculture
- Urban horticulture
- Urban forestry
- Vertical farming

== Bibliography ==
- Thomas, Frieder; Schmidt, Götz (2006). Förderung von Existenzgründungen in der Landwirtschaft: ein Projekt im Auftrag des BMELV (03HS016): Projektbericht. Münster-Hiltrup: Landwirtschaftsverlag. ISBN 3-7843-0513-X.
