= Coffee production in Kenya =

Coffee production is a significant contributor to the economy of Kenya. The industry is noted for its cooperative system of production, processing, milling, marketing, and auction system. About 70% of Kenyan coffee is produced in small farms that control about 75% of the land under production. It was estimated in 2012 that there were about 150,000 coffee farmers in Kenya. Other sources suggest that 6 million Kenyans are employed directly or indirectly in the coffee industry.

The acidic soil in the highlands of central Kenya together with just the right amount of sunlight and rainfall provide excellent conditions for growing coffee plants. However, due to a property boom in areas that grow coffee and price instability, production in this African Great Lakes country fell from about 130,000 tonnes in 1987/8 to 40,000 tonnes in 2011/12.

Kenya primarily produces Arabica coffee. Kenyan coffee is classified as a “Colombia Mild” type and is characterized by its intense flavor, full body, and aroma, which may include notes of cocoa. High-grade Kenyan coffee is traded in international markets and is sought after by coffee buyers.

== History ==
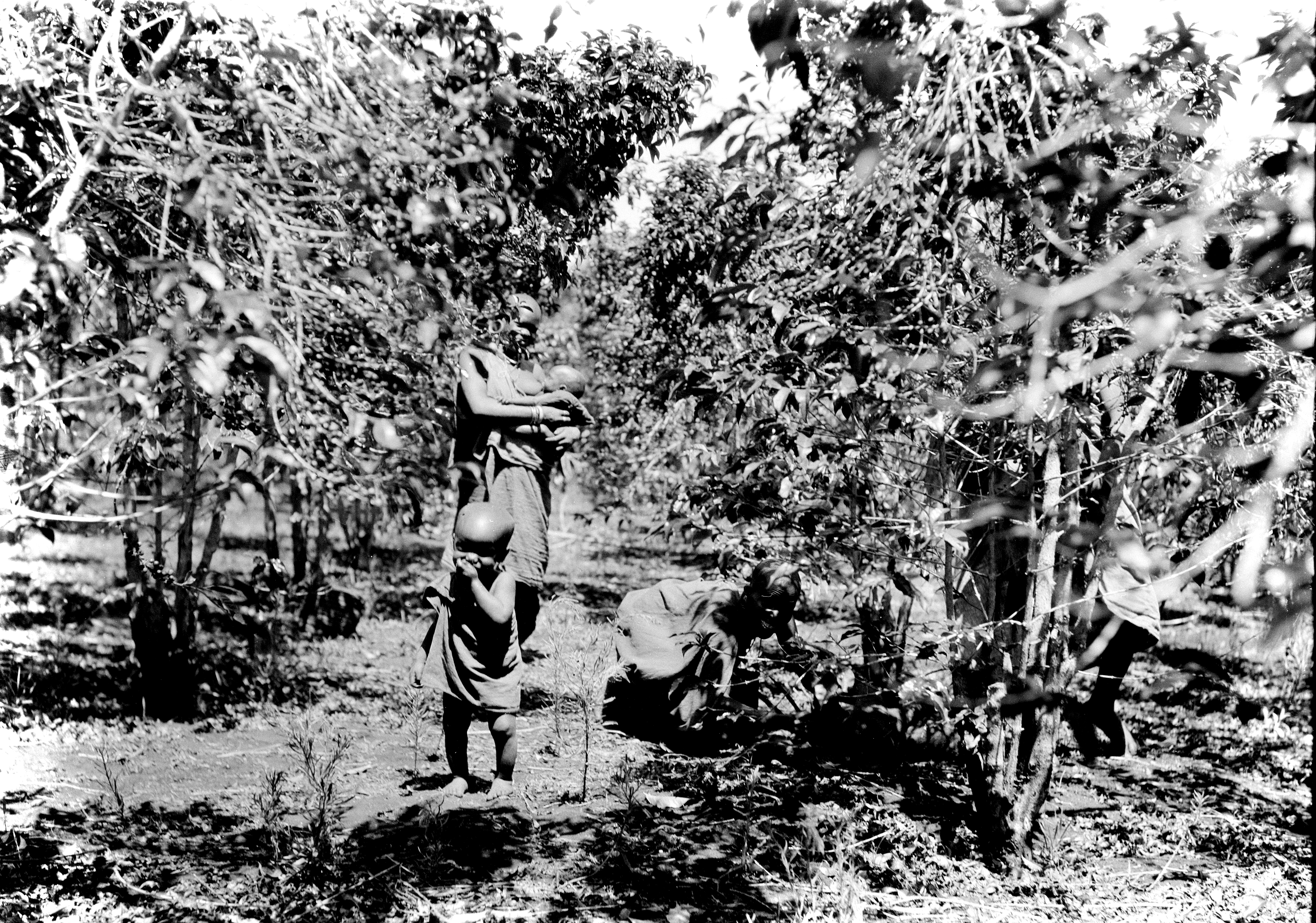
A coffee plantation in Kenya in 1936.

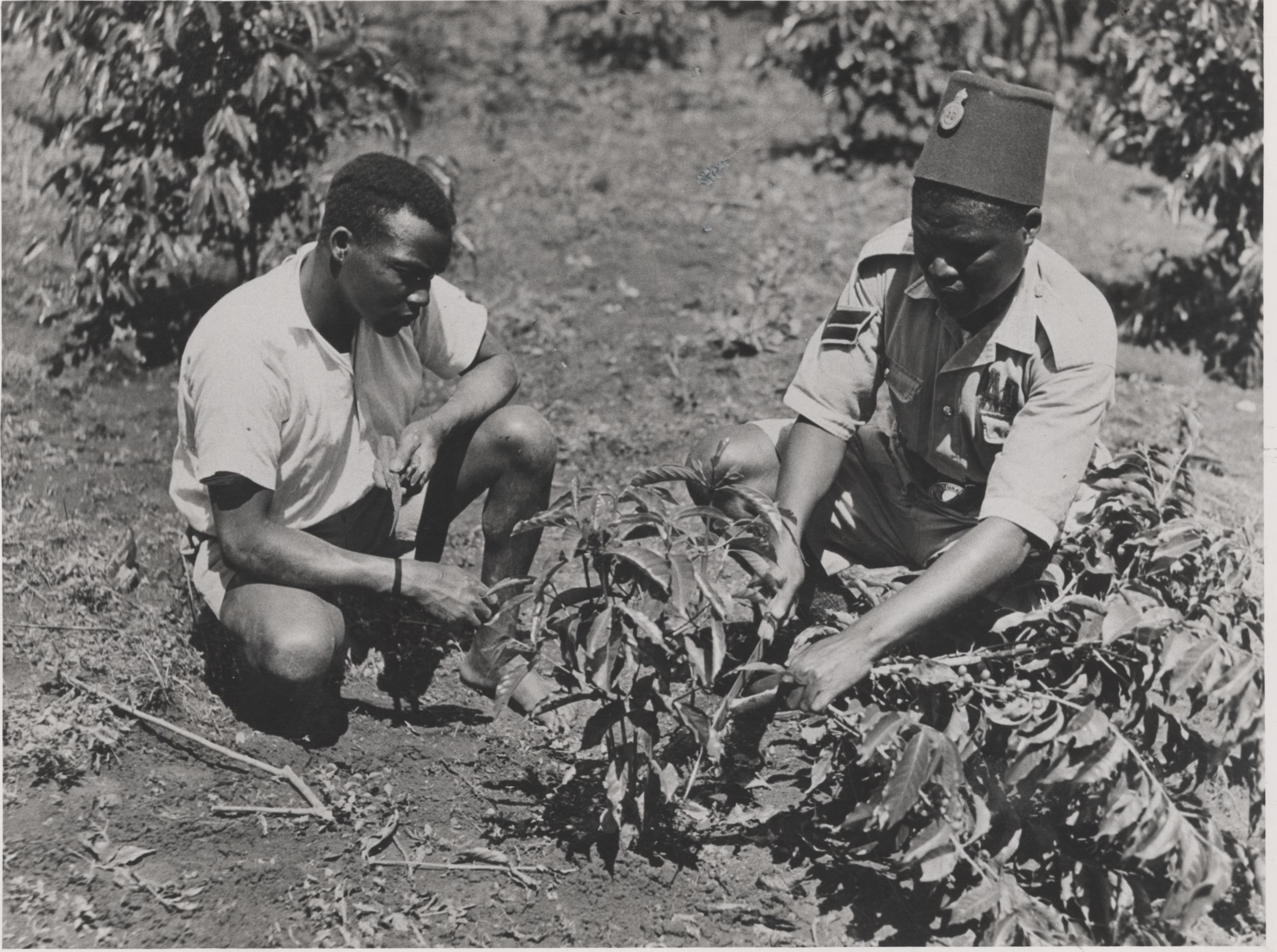
A coffee planter is shown how to prune by an Agricultural Department Instructor in 1955

Despite its proximity to Ethiopia (widely believed to be the region from which coffee originated), one source states that coffee was not cultivated in Kenya until 1893, when French Holy Ghost Fathers introduced coffee trees from Reunion Island. The mission farms near Nairobi were used as the nucleus around which Kenyan coffee growing developed. Another reference claims the British introduced coffee growing about 1900. In 1933 the Coffee Act was passed, establishing the Kenyan Coffee Board which moved the sale of coffee back to Kenya. In the early 1950s, an agricultural act was passed to create family holdings that combined subsistence farming with the production of cash crops for additional income. This act was known as the Swynnerton Plan.

== Economic impact ==
Coffee is a key forex earner for the country. Data from the Kenya National Bureau of Statistics (KNBS) indicates that coffee production in recent years has ranged from 34,500 to 51,900 tonnes.

In the 2022-2023 coffee year, $127.8 million worth of coffee was sold through the Nairobi Coffee Exchange. This marked a 43.8% decrease from the 2021-2022 coffee year when $227.3 million was exchanged. This was largely caused by a drop in the price of coffee in the New York Intercontinental Commodity Exchange. These prices began a rebound in 2024.

== Major coffee production areas ==
The major coffee-growing regions in Kenya are the high plateaus around Mount Kenya, the Aberdare Range, Kisii, Nyanza, Bungoma, Nakuru, Kericho, Nandi, Mt. Elgon and to a smaller scale in Machakos and Taita hills in Eastern and coast provinces respectively.

== Notable coffee estates, cooperatives and factories. ==
- Kipkelion District Co-operative Union including Mill Factory serving more than 40,000 farmers
- Gikanda Cooperative Society — Gichathaini, Kangocho and Ndaroini Factories (Mathira, Nyeri)
- Kibirigwi Farmers Cooperative Society (kirinyaga)
- New Gikaru (Nyeri-Mukurwe-ini)
- Tekangu Cooperative Society — Tegu, Karogoto and Ngunguru Factories (Mathira, Nyeri)
- Thiriku Farmers Co-op Society (Thingingi Area, Nyeri)
- Mutheka Farmers Co-operative Society - Chorong'i Coffee Factory (Nyeri), Kigwandi Coffee Factory (Nyeri), Kihuyo Coffee Factory (Nyeri), Muthuaini Coffee Factory (Nyeri), Kamuyu Coffee Factory (Nyeri), Kaihuri Coffee Factory (Nyeri)
- Iyego Farmers Cooperative Society - Main, Mununga, Gatubu, Marimira, Gitura, Kirangano, Watuha (Murang'a)
- Karunguru coffee estate (Juja Kenya)
- Othaya Co-operative Society (Othaya, Nyeri)
- Rung'eto Farmers Co-operative Society - Kii, Karimikui and Kiangoi Factories (Kirinyaga County, Ngariama ward)
- Baragwi Farmers Co-operative Society - Karumandi, Kianyaga, Gachame Factories
- Meru Central Coffee Co-Operative Union - along Meru-Embu Highway

== See also ==
- Coffee production in Uganda
- Coffee production in Tanzania
- List of countries by coffee production
- Coffee production in Rwanda
- Coffee production in Ethiopia

== Bibliography ==
- Hyde, David. "'Paying for the Emergency by displacing the settlers': global coffee and rural restructuring in late colonial Kenya." Journal of Global History, Volume 4, Number 1 (2009).
- Hyde, David. "Coffee and Decolonisation in Kenya: Overproduction, Quotas and Rural Restructuring." Commodities of Empire Working Paper Number 8, July 2008.
