= Nairobi Coffee Exchange =

Central Marketplace for Trading Coffee in Kenya

The Nairobi Coffee Exchange (NCE) is Kenya's central marketplace for the trading of coffee produced in Kenya. It is located in the country's capital and largest city, Nairobi. The exchange plays a key role in determining coffee prices in Kenya, which are set through an auction system.

== History ==
Coffee was first introduced to Kenya by the British starting in 1893. The first auction was held in 1935. In 1963, the same year Kenya was granted independence from England, the government mandated weekly coffee auctions to support the growth of agricultural exports leading to the Nairobi Coffee Exchange.

== Governance and operations ==
The exchange is managed by the Kenya Coffee Producers and Traders Association (KCPTA). It operates under the oversight of the Capital Markets Authority and the Agriculture and Food Authority. The governance of the NCE involves various stakeholders, including government representatives, coffee traders, and farmers, ensuring a balanced representation of interests within Kenya's coffee sector. The exchange contracts with the Co-operative Bank of Kenya to run its trading platforms.

The exchange is located in Wakulima House hosted by the Kenya Planters’ Cooperative Union.

== Auctions ==
Auctions are held weekly at the Coffee Exchange. The auctions are the primary way Kenyan coffee is bought and sold, with almost all Kenyan arabica coffee sold through the exchange. The Nairobi Coffee Exchange uses the New York ICE futures index as a benchmark. Varieties of Kenyan coffee traded at the exchange include premium AA grade coffee and AII grade.

The auctions were suspended for a number of weeks in 2023 as the government suspended licenses for coffee buyers and marketers as part of reforms. In 2024, the exchange reported having an average of 18 buyers and 10 sellers at each auction.
