= Swynnerton Plan =

Kenya agriculture policy

The Swynnerton Plan was a colonial agricultural policy that appeared as a government report in 1954 in Kenya, aiming to intensify the development of agricultural practice in the Kenya Colony. The plan was geared to expanding native Kenyan's cash-crop production through improved markets and infrastructure, the distribution of appropriate inputs, and the gradual consolidation and enclosure of land holdings.

== Overview ==
Roger Swynnerton was an official in the Department of Agriculture, and the main objective of the plan was to create family holdings large enough to keep the family self-sufficient in food and also enable them to practise alternate husbandry and thus develop a cash income. It was envisioned that 600,000 African families would have farming units of approximately ten acres a family, which would raise their average productivity in cash sales from £10 to £100 a year after providing for their own needs. In drawing up his plan, Swynnerton assumed twenty years would be needed to implement it.

When the Swynnerton Report was first published, its findings, in complement with the East Africa Royal Commission 1953–1955, were a reversal of previous colonial policies on native agricultural practices. It recommended that all high-quality native land be surveyed and enclosed; that the policy of maintaining 'traditional' or tribal systems of land tenure be reversed; and all the thousands of fragmented holdings be consolidated and enclosed. The 'progressive' farmers would thereby be able to obtain credit, which had been previously denied them, whilst the new title deeds would create security of tenure which would lead to investment and rural development. Furthermore, it recommended that native African farmers be allowed to grow cash crops, be given a major increase in technical assistance, and have access to all marketing facilities, all of which were previously available and restricted to the white settler minority.

The results were dramatic: the value of recorded output from the small-holdings rose from £5.2 million in 1955 to £14 million in 1964, coffee accounting for 55 percent of the increase.

Moreover, the plan also sought to consolidate scattered landholdings in Central Province so that land ownership could be concentrated in the hands of a few farmers. These individuals would then become transformed into what was envisaged as an 'African middle class' that engaged in economic production, while at the same time offering employment to the bulk of those rendered landless by the plan. It was anticipated that the remaining landless peasants would become small-scale rural craftsmen.

== Impacts on the political economy ==
The plan was implemented during the Mau Mau Uprising, and implementation served the politically expedient needs of the colonial government. These reforms, which were intended to increase the opportunities for Africans in the colonial society and to integrate them more effectively into the changing pattern of the economy, could not contain African politics. Nor could African politicians be 'pocketed', because the land and other economic reforms that been introduced, while benefiting indigenous capital interests, fell far short of popular demands. For example, the land consolidation programme had repressive political objectives. In the words of the Special Commissioner for Central Province, 'Thus land consolidation was to complete the work of the [State of] Emergency: to stabilise a conservative middle class, based on the loyalists; and, as confiscated land was to be thrown into the common land pool during consolidation, it was also to confirm the landlessness of the rebels.'.

So the state intensified the spread of cash crops and dairy cattle in the African reserves, on the startling new basis of generalised private, freehold, property. For the Kikuyu, land registration and consolidation during the Emergency was the final, bitter, codification of Kikuyu clan history. By this, the plan amounted to a mental revolution for those at the bottom of Kikuyu society, destroying the ahoi (tenant) option for these landless poor, amounting to around one-third of the tribe's population. Henceforth, they had no kin, no ancestral land, no marginal marshlands in the reserves to go to; a new Kikuyu society was born—propertied and propertyless—and left to face an uncertain future in face of the politics of independence.

== Stepping stone to Independence ==
Despite this, the greater lasting benefits of the Swynnerton plan proposals were that they were accepted in full by the Royal Commission, which went further with them, recommending the removal of all racial and political barriers inhibiting the free movement of land, labour, and capital, and the recognition of private interests in land. Although the two recommendations were accepted with some modifications to suit the European farmers, they set the stage for an impending land settlement programme intended to formalise greater African participation in agriculture, the mainstay of Kenya's economy.

These twin policies of land consolidation and removal of all barriers to the functioning of land market were put into practise by 1960, and enabled a reconciliation between the departing colonial authority and the leaders of an independent Kenya.

== Bibliography ==
- Anderson, David (2005). Histories of the Hanged: The Dirty War in Kenya and the End of Empire. London: Weidenfeld and Nicolson. ISBN 0-393-05986-3.
- Atieno-Odhiambo, Elisha Stephen (1995). "The Formative Years: 1945–55". In Ogot, Bethwell Alan; Ochieng, William Robert (eds.). Decolonization and Independence in Kenya, 1940–93. Oxford: James Currey. pp. 25–47. ISBN 978-0-821-41051-6.
- Berman, Bruce; Lonsdale, John (1992). Unhappy Valley: Conflict in Kenya and Africa; Book Two: Violence & Ethnicity. Oxford: James Currey. ISBN 978-0-852-55099-1.
- Collier, Paul; Lal, Deepak (1986). Labour and Poverty in Kenya, 1900–1980. Oxford: Clarendon Press. ISBN 978-0-198-28505-2.
- Kanogo, Tabitha (1993) [1987]. Squatters and the Roots of Mau Mau, 1905–63. Nairobi: East African Educational Publishers. ISBN 9966463267.
- Ochieng', William Robert (1995). "Structural & Political Changes". In Ogot, Bethwell Alan; Ochieng', William Robert (eds.). Decolonization and Independence in Kenya, 1940–93. Oxford: James Currey. pp. 83–109. ISBN 978-0-821-41051-6.
- Ogot, Bethwell Alan (1995). "The Decisive Years: 1956–63". In Ogot, Bethwell Alan; Ochieng', William Robert (eds.). Decolonization and Independence in Kenya, 1940–93. Oxford: James Currey. pp. 48–82. ISBN 978-0-821-41051-6.
- Oucho, John O. (2002). Undercurrents of Ethnic Conflict in Kenya. African Social Studies Series. Vol. 3. Leiden: Brill. ISBN 978-9-004-12459-2.
- Swynnerton, R.J.M. (1955). The Swynnerton Report: A plan to intensify the development of African agriculture in Kenya. Nairobi: Government Printer.
