= Tabitha Kanogo =

Kenyan historian and academic

- Occupations: Historian; academic

Academic background
- Education: University of Nairobi

Academic work
- Discipline: History
- Sub-discipline: African history; Kenyan history
- Institutions: University of California, Berkeley
- Notable works: Squatters and the Roots of Mau Mau, 1905–1963; African Womanhood in Colonial Kenya, 1900–1950; Wangari Maathai

Tabitha Kanogo is a Kenyan historian and academic. She is a professor in the Department of History at the University of California, Berkeley. Her work focuses on the social and cultural history of Kenya, including colonialism, gender, and the history of childhood and youth. Kanogo is the author of studies of colonial Kenya including Squatters and the Roots of Mau Mau, 1905–1963 (1987) and African Womanhood in Colonial Kenya, 1900–1950 (2005).

== Education and career ==
Kanogo earned her PhD at the University of Nairobi. She is a professor in the Department of History at the University of California, Berkeley. Her work includes Kenyan social and cultural history and projects on Nakuru, and comparative histories of childhood and youth endangerment in Africa.She was previously a senior fellow at the Townsend Center for the Humanities (2017–2018).

Kanogo’s work has been situated within major historiographical discussions of colonial Kenya, with a use of archival sources showing how colonial rule reshaped social institutions affecting women’s lives. Her book Squatters and the Roots of Mau Mau, 1905–1963 examines squatter labour on settler estates in colonial Kenya and tensions surrounding land and labour in the period leading to the Mau Mau uprising.

In African Womanhood in Colonial Kenya, 1900–1950, Kanogo examines women’s lives and changing social institutions under colonial rule in Kenya, including the relationship between formal legal regimes and customary practices. The book has been placed within broader debates on gender history and social change in colonial Kenya. Kanogo authored a biography of Wangarĩ Maathai for the Ohio Short Histories of Africa series. This biography has been characterized as accessible, with an interpretive depth about Maathai’s public life and contradictions. It describes Maathai's upbringing, her activism and her scholarship.

== Selected works ==
- ---- (1987) Squatters and the Roots of Mau Mau, 1905–1963
- ---- (2005) African Womanhood in Colonial Kenya, 1900–1950
- ---- (2020) Wangari Maathai

== See also ==
- Squatting in Kenya
- Women in Kenya
