= Coffee production in Tanzania =

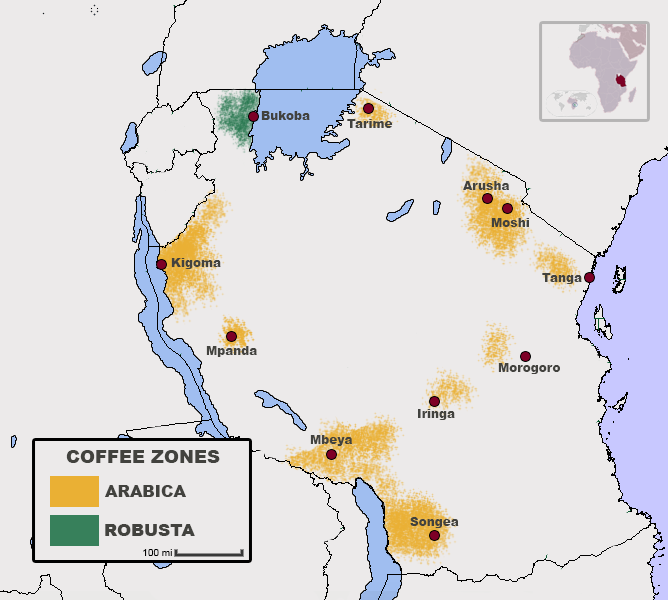
The eleven coffee industry production zones of Tanzania by Bean Type

Coffee production in Tanzania is a significant aspect of its economy as it is Tanzania's largest export crop. Tanzanian coffee production averages between 30,000 and 40,000 metric tons annually of which approximately 70% is Arabica and 30% is Robusta.

The nine main growing regions of Arabica are in:

1. Iringa
2. Kigoma
3. Matengo Highlands
4. Mbeya
5. Mbinga
6. Morogoro
7. Ngara
8. North Kilimanjaro
9. Usambara Mountains

The main growing region of Robusta are Kyerwa and Karagwe areas of the Kagera Region. Two new species were found recently in Tanzania's Eastern Arc Mountains, Coffea bridsoniae and C. kihansiensis. Harvest time is traditionally October to February. Ninety percent of the nation's coffee farms are smallholder, with the remainder being plantations. The industry estimates are approximately 270,000 personnel involved in the coffee industry.

Before 1990, the State coffee board and the cooperative unions were responsible for marketing coffee. Reforms in 1990 and in 1994–95 affected export pricing. Coffee wilt disease appeared in Tanzania in 1997, spreading rapidly and causing serious losses.

== History ==
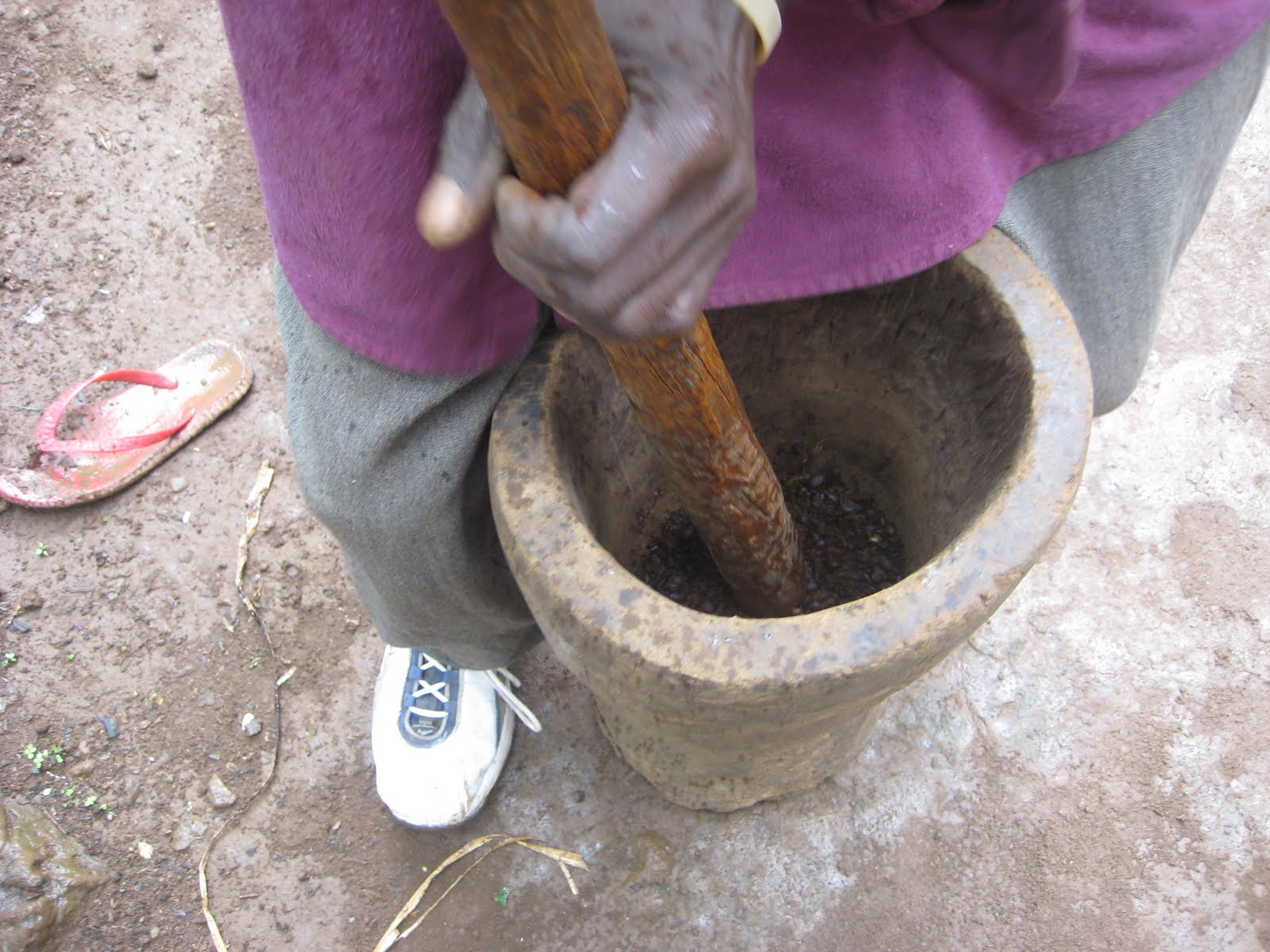
Farmer crushing coffee beans, 90% of coffee farmers in the country are small scale farmers

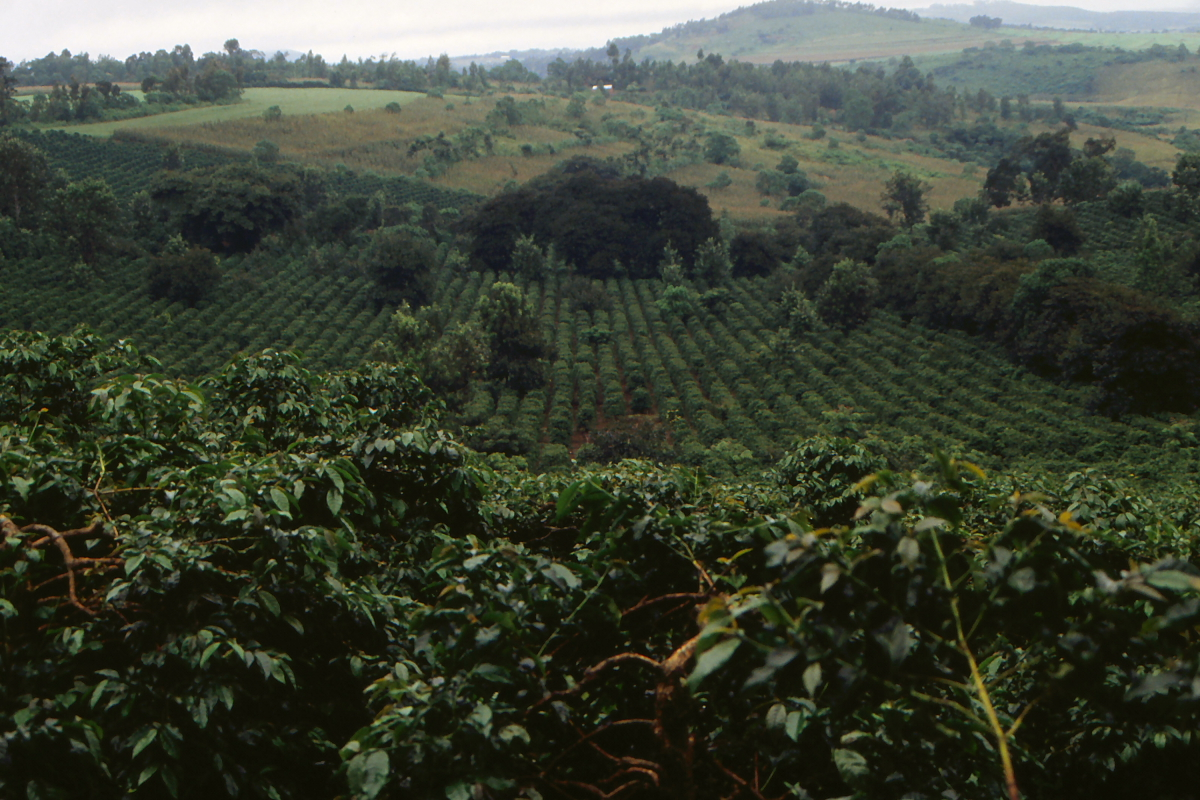
Coffee plantation on Gibb's farm, in Karatu, Arusha, Tanzania

=== Early history ===
Coffee was introduced into the Tanzanian region from modern day Ethiopia in the 16th century. Coffee was not really brewed in the region but was used as a stimulant. Through oral sources in the region the Haya tribe located in northwest Tanzania in modern-day Kagera region was the only recorded tribe that used the beans. The tribe boiled the Robusta beans and steamed them with various herbs and chewed on the mixture as a stimulant. The tribe also used the coffee beans as a form of currency and the growing and cultivating of the beans were highly controlled by tribal leaders.

=== Coffee During Colonization ===
The German colonization of the region in the late 19th century changed the value of the crop in the region. In 1911, German colonists mandated the planting of Arabica coffee trees throughout the Bukoba region. The Germans introduced various laws that reduced the control of tribal leaders over the cultivation of the crop and the coffee seeds were made widely available. The Haya tribe was forced to grow different food crops such as bananas and pineapples and were pressured to grow the new Arabica variant introduced by the Germans. In other regions of the country the Germans introduced the bean in the North of the region near Kilimanjaro and Tanga. Due to the abolishing of slavery tribal chiefs that relied on the trade for income such as the Chagga tribe, entirely switched to cultivating the Coffee beans.

After World War I when the British took over Tanganyika they further accelerated the campaign to grow coffee in the region and introduced various land reform laws. The British also continued to receive resistance from the Haya people and coffee production in the north-west region remained stagnant. However, the Chagga tribe who had no history of cultivating the crop continued to produce the crop and in 1925 exported 6,000 tonnes worth $1.2 million. With the expansion of the railway into the country the British expanded their network of coffee farmers. In 1925 the Kilimanjaro Native Planters’ Association (KNPA) was formed and it was the first of many coffee cooperatives formed in the country, formed to help farmers obtain a better price.

=== Post-Independence Production ===
After independence the socialist government of Tanzania saw a lot of promise in the crop and aspired to double the crop production. Various schemes and loans were given to coffee farms to increase production. Furthermore, large governmental estates were created in the southern part of the country namely in Mbozi and Mbinga regions. The government expanded the idea of farmers cooperatives into areas that had no prior cooperative experience or need. Most of the cooperatives failed and the mass movement of the population due to Ujamaa in the early 1970s hampered production. Before, 1976 all coffee trades were handled by two cooperative owned coffee processing factories one in Moshi (arabica) and the other in Bukoba (robusta) and then it was sold at the Moshi auction. in 1977 all coffee cooperative unions were dissolved and the government mandated the Coffee Authority of Tanzania. The coffee production in the country suffered drastically due to major governmental interventions and high cost of growing.

Reform in the early 1990s which privatized the industry drastically increased the efficiency of the system. The Tanzanian Coffee Board was reinstated to issue permits and licenses and coffee growing and selling was made entirely independent. Moreover, they are responsible for grading beans and running the Moshi Coffee Auction.

== Grading and Sale ==
=== Grading ===
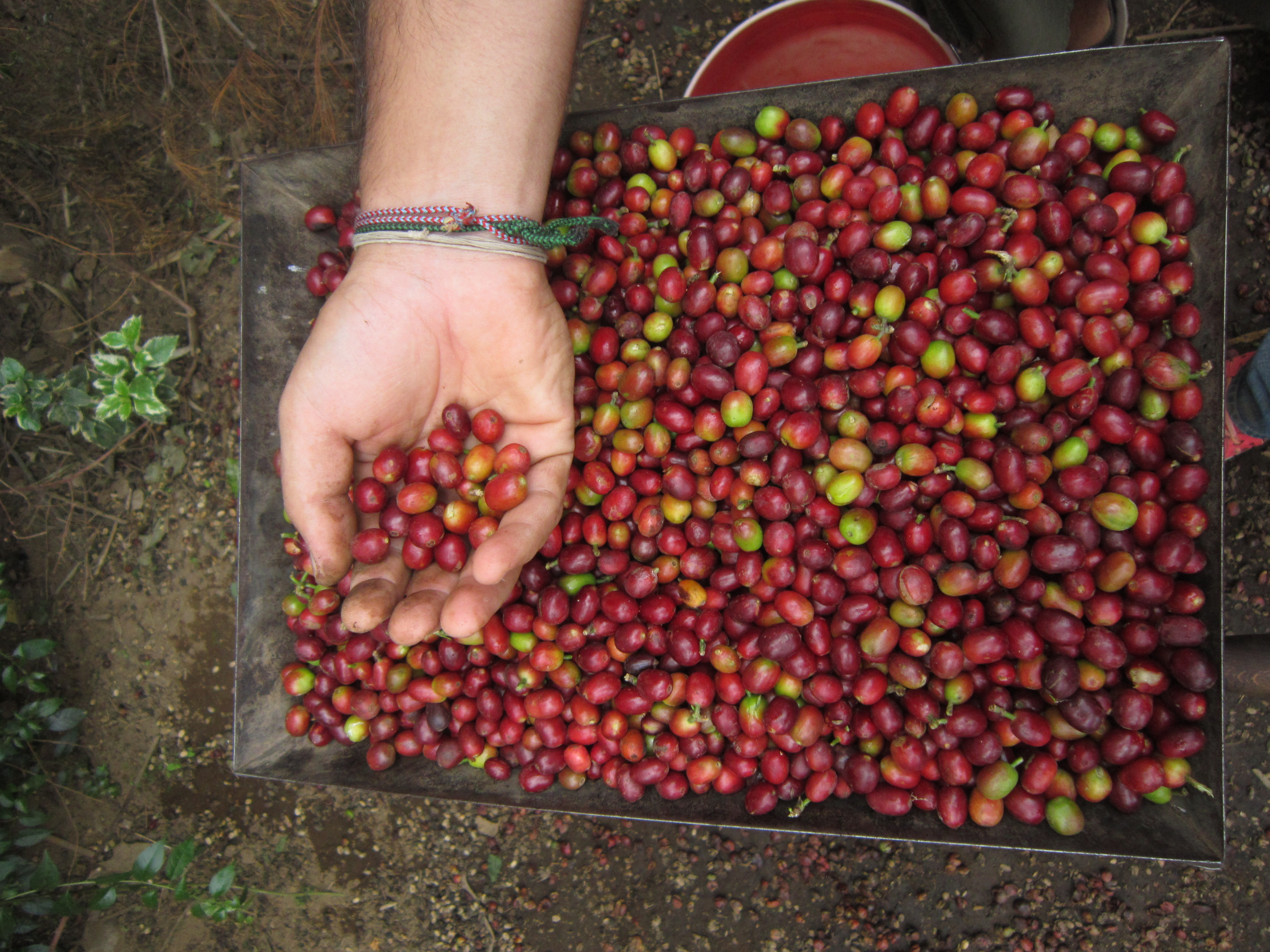
An example of a red coffee cherries collected during a harvest

Due to the country's colonial past, Tanzania opted for British nomenclature of grading Coffee, which is done according to shape, size and density of the beans.

These eleven grades include;

1. AA
2. A
3. B
4. PB
5. C
6. E
7. F
8. AF
9. TT
10. UG
11. TEX

=== Market ===
There are three ways a farmer can sell his product. The Internal market where the produce is sold at a price decided by the farmer directly to private coffee buyers, village groups or coffee cooperatives. This practice is the most common between small farmers due to the low yields per farmer. Once the private coffee buyers and cooperatives have received a significant amount of produce they can either sell their goods at the Moshi Coffee Auction or export the product directly. Most top grade coffee growers are allowed to bypass the auction and are able to sell their coffee directly to the foreign roasters. This policy was created by the Coffee Board of Tanzania to allow farmers and local companies to build a long-term relationship with international buyers.

==== Moshi Coffee Exchange ====
The Moshi Coffee Exchange is in Moshi, Kilimanjaro Region and holds a weekly auction for a 9-month season. Auctions are conducted weekly on Thursdays and all local exporters that do not have a license to bypass the exchange have to export through the auction. The auction is attended by licensed exporters and there are no limits placed on how much a single exporter can purchase. Below is a sample of average prices of coffee (per 50 kg bag) at the auction held on 15 January 2015

=== Mild Coffee ===
1. AA - $192.01
2. A - $185.19
3. AB - $194.45
4. B - $183.67
5. PB - $186.99
6. C - $186.00

=== Hard Coffee ===
1. Robusta Organic - $98.00
2. Robusta Screen 18 - $104.20
3. Robusta Superior - $95.00
4. Robusta FAQ - $83.60

=== Unwashed Arabica ===
1. Arabica FAQ - $172.94

== Production ==
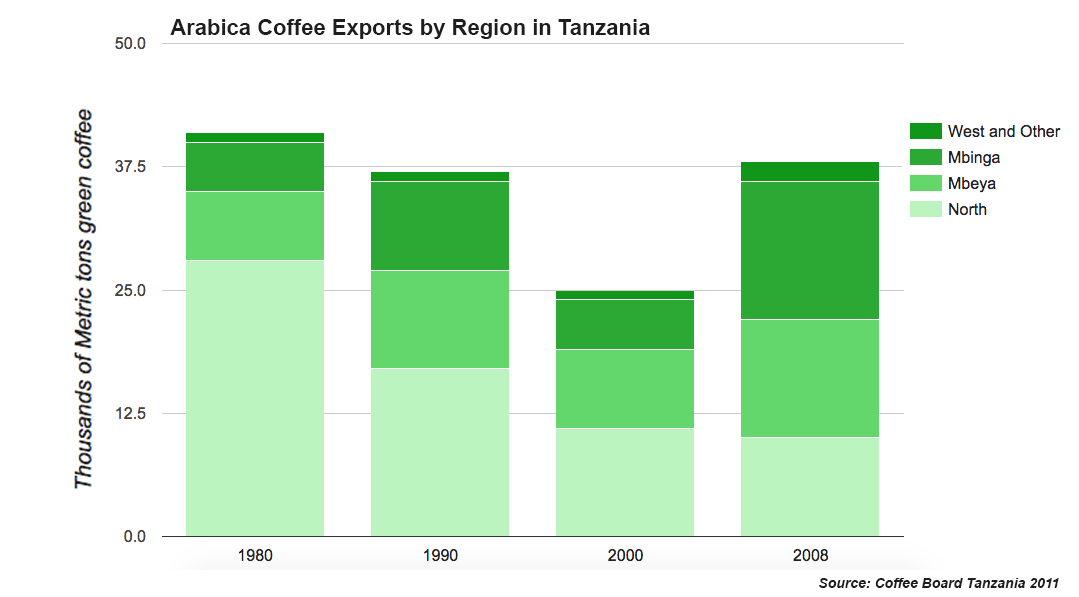
Arabica coffee output by region in Tanzania

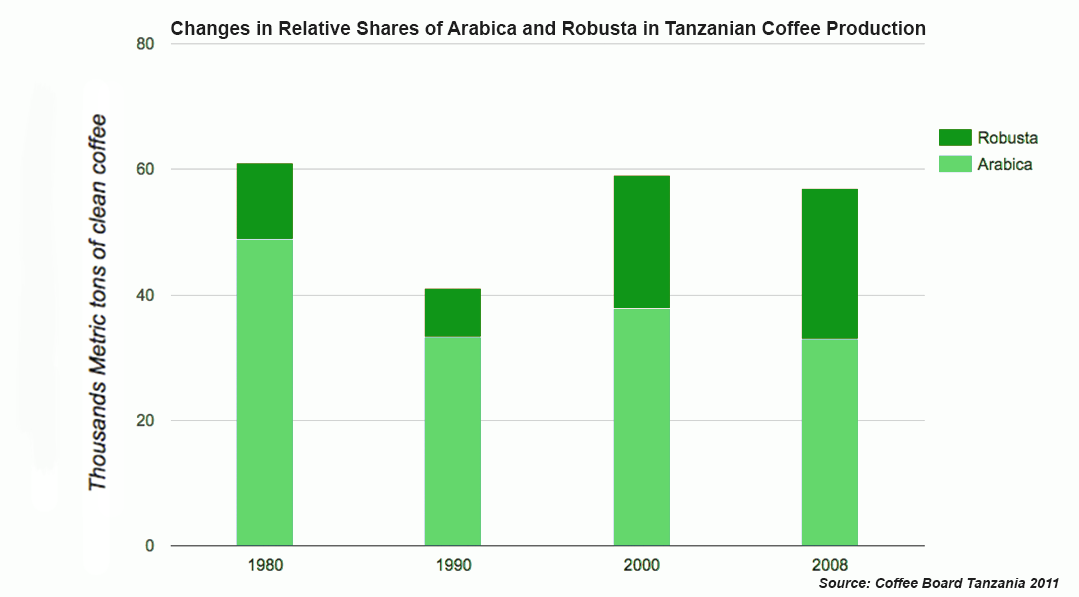
Total coffee output by bean type in Tanzania

The Tanzanian economy is heavily based on agriculture and it provides 24% of the national gross domestic product. In 2014 3.3% of Tanzania's export worth $186 million was coffee. More than 90% of the country's output originates from small farmers rather than estates and provides employment to 40,000 families and affect more than 2.4 million citizens directly. Coffee being the second highest valued agriculture export after tobacco. Major purchasers of Tanzanian coffee is Japan (22%), Italy (19%) and the United States (12%). Germany used to be the largest purchaser of Tanzanian coffee however with increased marketing and better quality control, Japan and the United States have begun to buy the lion share of the exports.

The Tanzanian coffee board has met many challenges over the years and works continuously on making a better brand name for the Tanzanian coffee. Most of the country's export is used to blend in with other brands causing it to lose value on the international market. However, in Japan, Tanzanian coffee has managed to maintain a brand called "Kilimanjaro coffee". In 1991 the All Japan Fair Trade Council decided that all Tanzanian coffee can retain the label "Kilimanjaro coffee" regardless of what region in Tanzania it was produced. Furthermore, any coffee blend that contains 30% or more Tanzanian beans can also use the label. This major step forward in the Japanese market has caused for an appreciation in value for Tanzanian coffee in the country and today Japan is the highest importer of the bean.

Local consumption of coffee is nearly not as large as the export volume. Due to high amounts of poverty in the country coffee is more expensive than tea and the populace consumes more tea. However, in the recent year local coffee consumption is increasing and has gone from 2% of production in 2003 to 7% in 2014.

== Tanzania Coffee Research Institute ==
The Tanzania Coffee Research Institute was founded in 2000 as a non-profit government company and began operations in September 2001. The institute is primarily government owned and other members of the coffee community have a stake in the company. The company is a non profit and is entirely reliant on government funding, donors and the sale of farming materials and tools. Due to the declining output of coffee in Tanzania since the 1990s the institute is tasked to rejuvenate the coffee industry in the country and help increase revenue from coffee exports. The institute provides a service to the thousands of farmers in the industry with relevant technological advances and educating farmers on better farming practices in keeping with continuous profession development and current coffee farming industry best practises.

== See also ==
- Coffee production in Uganda
- Coffee production in Kenya
- List of countries by coffee production
