= Coffee production in Uganda =

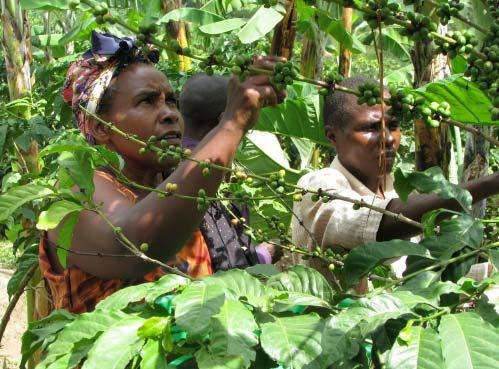
A female coffee farmer at a field training school

Coffee is Uganda's top-earning export crop. In 1989 Uganda's coffee production capacity exceeded its quota of 2.3 million bags, but export volumes were still diminished by economic and security problems, and large amounts of coffee beans were still being smuggled out of Uganda for sale in neighbouring countries. Uganda is one of the few countries in the world with indigenous coffee, with Robusta coffee growing wild around Lake Victoria.

Some coffee farmers cultivated cocoa trees on land already producing robusta coffee. Cocoa production declined in the 1970s and 1980s, however, and market conditions discouraged international investors from viewing it as a potential counterweight to Uganda's reliance on coffee exports. Locally produced cocoa was of high quality, however, and the government continued to seek ways to rehabilitate the industry. Coffee production remained low during the late 1980s, rising from 1,000 tons in 1986 to only 5,000 tons in 1989. The Uganda Coffee Development Authority was formed in 1991 by government decree, in line with the liberalization of the coffee industry.

Robusta coffee grows natively in the Kampala forest area and the Lake Victoria Crescent. From 1999 to 2002 an effort was made to commercialize this coffee as a premium consumer brand, emulating and extending the success of shade grown in Central America. The Kibale Wild Coffee Project, an initiative that involved international organizations such as the World Bank and United States Agency for International Development, aimed to implement sustainable harvest of coffee from Uganda's natural reserves and guarantee compensation for all workers involved in the harvest. Revenue from the coffee production was intended to finance conservation management activities.

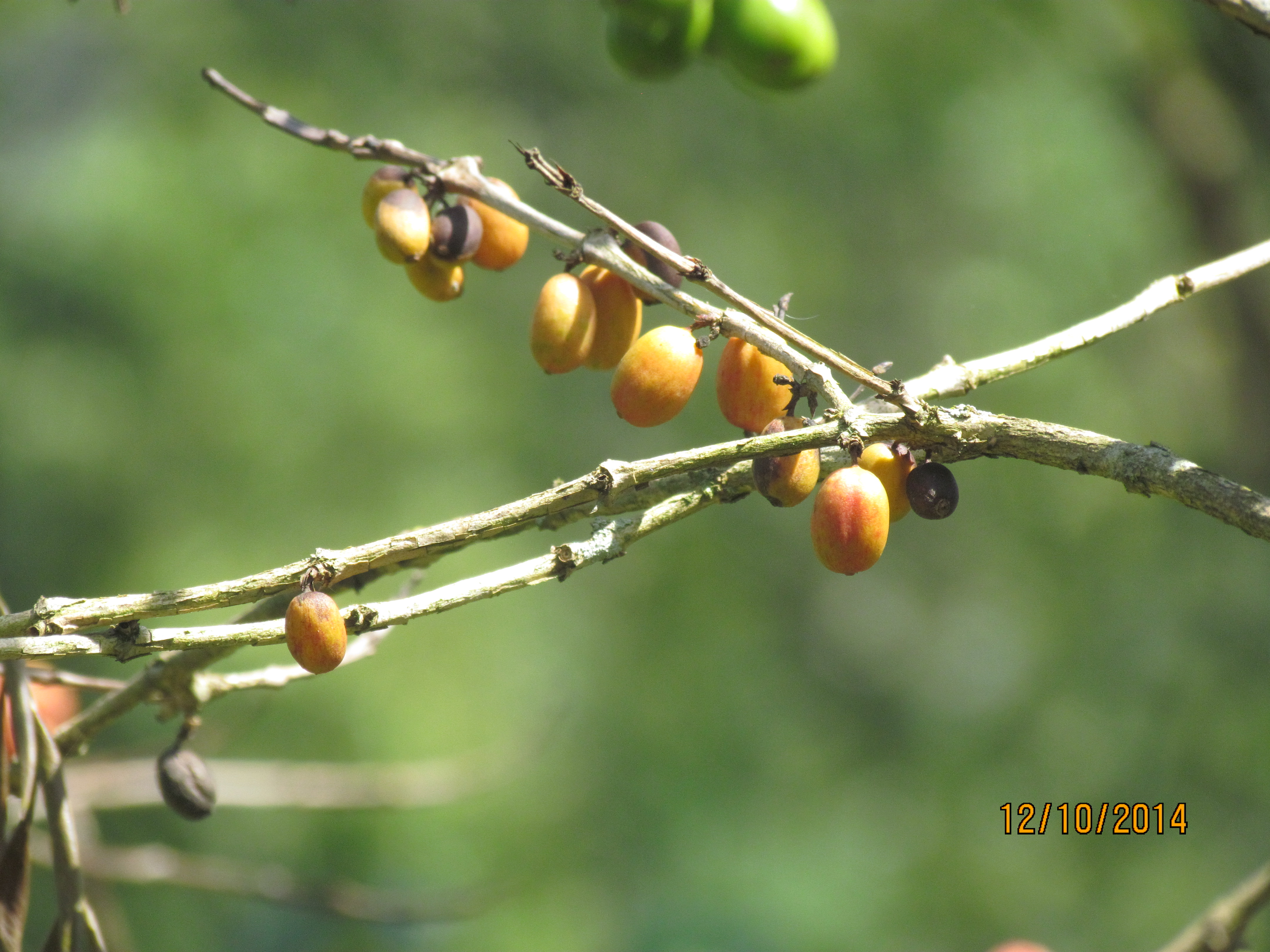
Coffee berries on a branch

Arabica coffee grows around the slopes of Mount Elgon. The coffee was introduced to Uganda from Ethiopia and naturalised along the slopes of Mount Elgon.

== Production trends ==
=== 1980s ===
Coffee continued to be Uganda's most important cash crop throughout the 1980s. The government estimated that farmers planted approximately 191,700 hectares of robusta coffee, most of this in south-eastern Uganda, and about 33,000 hectares of arabica coffee in high-altitude areas of south-eastern and south western Uganda. These figures remained almost constant throughout the decade, although a substantial portion of the nation's coffee output was smuggled into neighbouring countries to sell at higher prices. Between 1984 and 1986, the European Economic Community (EEC) financed a coffee rehabilitation program that gave improved coffee production a high priority. This program also supported research, extension work, and training programs to upgrade coffee farmers' skills and understanding of their role in the economy. Some funds were also used to rehabilitate coffee factories.

When the National Resistance Movement seized power in 1986, Museveni set high priorities on improving coffee production, reducing the amount of coffee smuggled into neighbouring countries, and diversifying export crops to reduce Uganda's dependence on world coffee prices. To accomplish these goals, in keeping with the second phase of the coffee rehabilitation program, the government raised coffee prices paid to producers in May 1986 and February 1987, claiming that the new prices more accurately reflected world market prices and local factors, such as inflation. The 1987 increase came after the Coffee Marketing Board launched an aggressive program to increase export volumes. Parchment (dried but unhulled) robusta producer prices rose from USh 24/= to 29/= per kilogram. Clean (hulled) robusta prices rose from 44/40 to 53/70 per kilogram. Prices for parchment arabica, grown primarily in the Bugisu district of south-eastern Uganda, reached 62/50 a kilogram, up from 50/=. Then in July 1988, the government again raised coffee prices from 50/= per kilogram to 111/= per kilogram for robusta, and from 62/= to 125/= per kilogram for arabica.

By December 1988, the Coffee Marketing Board was unable to pay farmers for new deliveries of coffee or to repay loans for previous purchases. The board owed USh 1,000 million to its suppliers and USh 2,500 million to the commercial banks, and although the government agreed to provide the funds to meet these obligations, some of them remained unpaid for another year.

Uganda was a member of the International Coffee Organization (ICO), a consortium of coffee-producing nations that set international production quotas and prices. The ICO set Uganda's annual export quota at only 4 percent of worldwide coffee exports. During December 1988, a wave of coffee buying pushed the ICO price up and triggered two increases of 1 million (60- kilogram) bags each in worldwide coffee production limits. The rising demand and rising price resulted in a 1989 global quota increase to 58 million bags. Uganda's export quota rose only by about 3,013 bags, however, bringing it to just over 2.3 million bags. Moreover, Uganda's entire quota increase was allocated to arabica coffee, which was grown primarily in the small southeastern region of Bugisu. In revenue terms, Uganda's overall benefit from the world price increase was small, as prices for robusta coffee—the major export—remained depressed.

In 1989 Uganda's coffee production capacity exceeded its quota of 2.3 million bags, but export volumes were still diminished by economic and security problems, and large amounts of coffee were still being smuggled out of Uganda for sale in neighbouring countries. Then in July 1989, the ICO agreement collapsed, as its members failed to agree on production quotas and prices, and they decided to allow market conditions to determine world coffee prices for two years. Coffee prices plummeted, and Uganda was unable to make up the lost revenues by increasing export volumes. In October 1989, the government devalued the shilling, making Uganda's coffee exports more competitive worldwide, but Ugandan officials still viewed the collapse of the ICO agreement as a devastating blow to the local economy. Fears that 1989 earnings for coffee exports would be substantially less than the US$264 million earned the previous year proved unfounded. Production in 1990, however, declined more than 20 percent to an estimated 133,000 tons valued at US$142 million because of drought, management problems, low prices, and a shift from coffee production to crops for local consumption.

Some coffee farmers cultivated cocoa plants on land already producing robusta coffee. Cocoa production declined in the 1970s and 1980s, however, and market conditions discouraged international investors from viewing it as a potential counterweight to Uganda's reliance on coffee exports. Locally produced cocoa was of high quality, however, and the government continued to seek ways to rehabilitate the industry. Production remained low during the late 1980s, rising from 1,000 tons in 1986 to only 5,000 tons in 1989.

=== 1990s ===
After exiting the International Coffee Organization, the Ugandan government continued its efforts to vitalize its international coffee export economy. In 1991, the Uganda Coffee Development Authority (UCDA) was formed by government decree, in line with the liberalization of the coffee industry. The UCDA is administered by the Ugandan Ministry of Agriculture, Animal Industry and Fisheries. During its tenure in the 1990s, the UCDA oversaw an exponential increase in coffee exports. In part due to the high price of the commodity on the international market that compensated the low production rates coming out of the 1980s. During the period between 1993 and 1997, international sales of robusta coffee increased to 110,000 tons per year.

=== 2000s-today ===
Coffee production in Uganda eventually encountered another slow down at the turn of the century. One of the primary reasons for this export drop resulted from the decreased demand for coffee, and consequently, a lower market price for the commodity. Additionally, Uganda's capacity to produce coffee was hindered by the onset of a widespread case of coffee-wilt disease, a fungus-induced wilt that results in complete death of coffee plants. Trees that suffer from coffee-wilt disease are not salvageable, and must be completely rooted out before it can spread to other trees or the soil. By 2003, as many as 45% of the nation's robusta coffee trees died from coffee-wilt disease. As a result, exports dropped dramatically, falling from 143,441 tons in 2000 to 122,369 tons in 2004.

== Arabica production ==
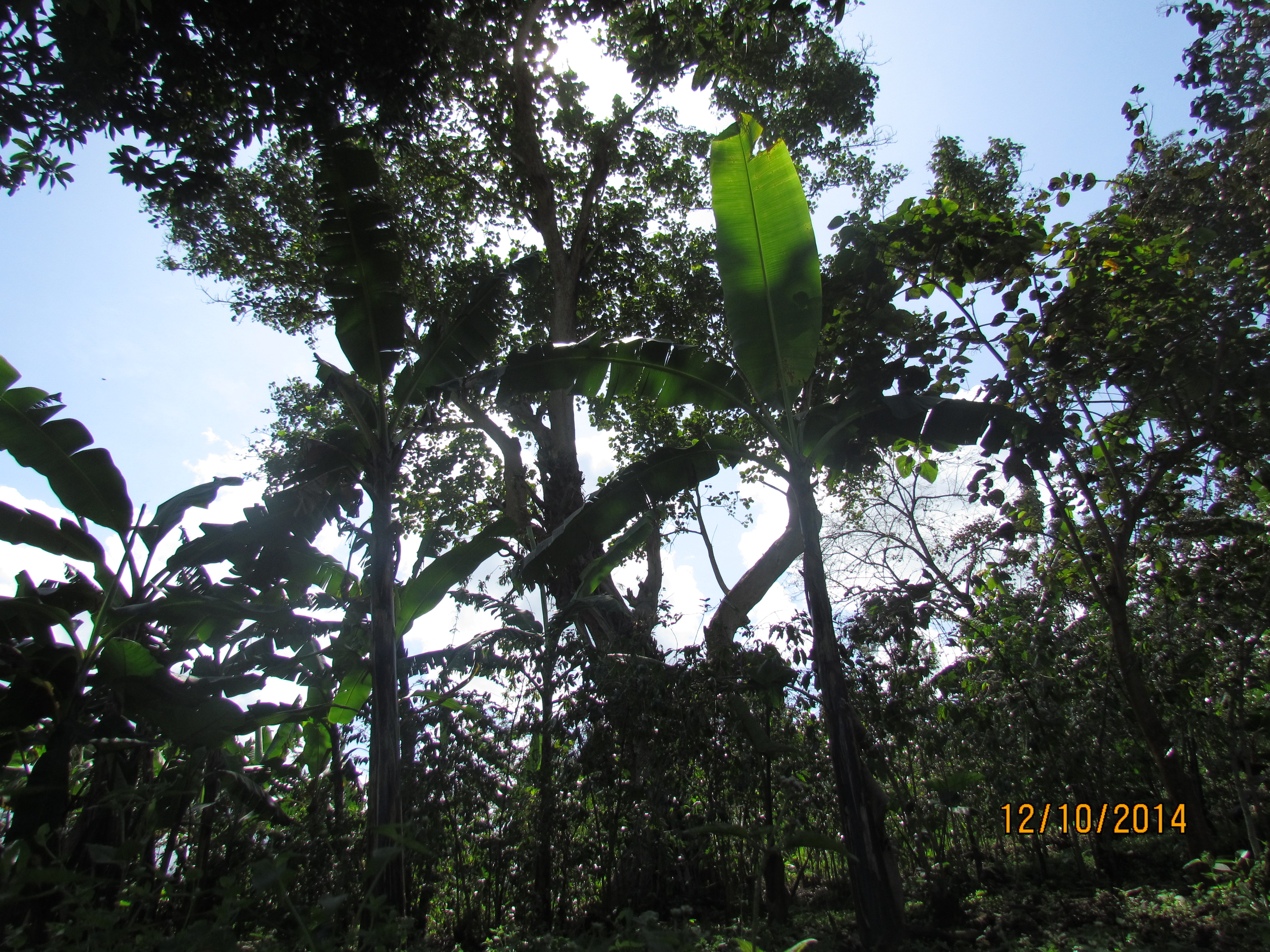
Shade trees

Pulping process

Arabica coffee is usually grown in mixed farms with food crops for home consumption like beans, peanuts and bananas. It is mainly grown under shade trees that ensure sustainable coffee production. The leaves that fall from the shade trees provide manure for the coffee plants.

In Mbale the planting season for Arabica coffee is between March and April and harvesting is between August and November. The coffee trees are pruned from December to February before the planting season. The trees flower during the dry season. However Bugisu cooperative union always finds policies of ensuring good coffee production and harvesting that meet the world standards Bugisu Co-operative Union Limited

=== Post harvesting ===
Arabica coffee initially goes through wet processing, which involves pulping (removal of pulp and mucilage) and washing the coffee beans. Pulping is the removal of the outer skin of the harvested red coffee berries. After pulping the mucilage around the bean is removed by use of water. The coffee beans are washed in a sisal made basket known as a washing basket.

Farmers then have two options for drying their coffee beans. Either they dry them under the sun until they reach the required moisture content or they pay to have them dried at a coffee factory. The remaining process involves removing the coffee husks, sorting of the different coffee bean sizes, roasting, grinding and packaging.

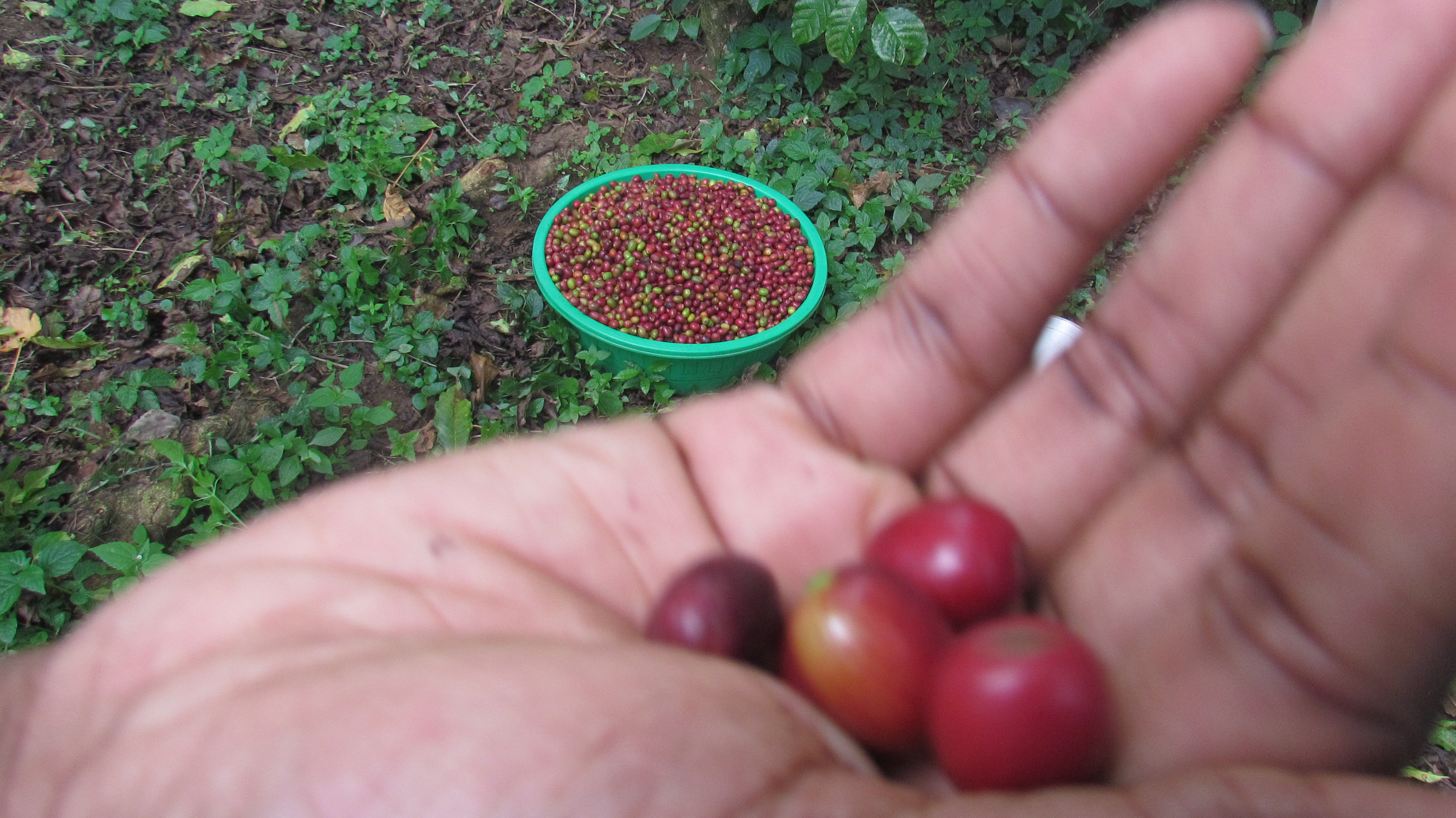
Red coffee berries

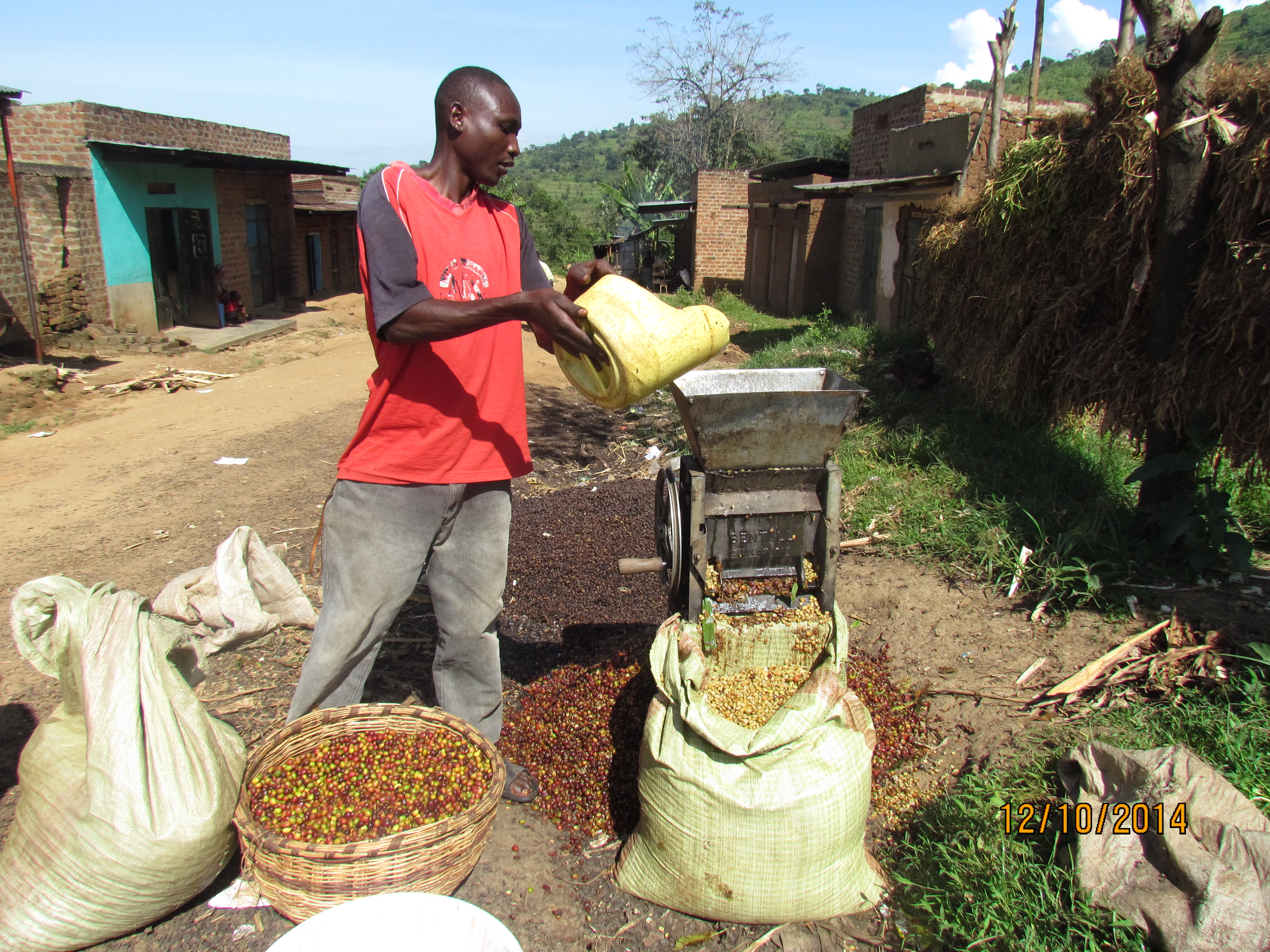
Pulping coffee mbale

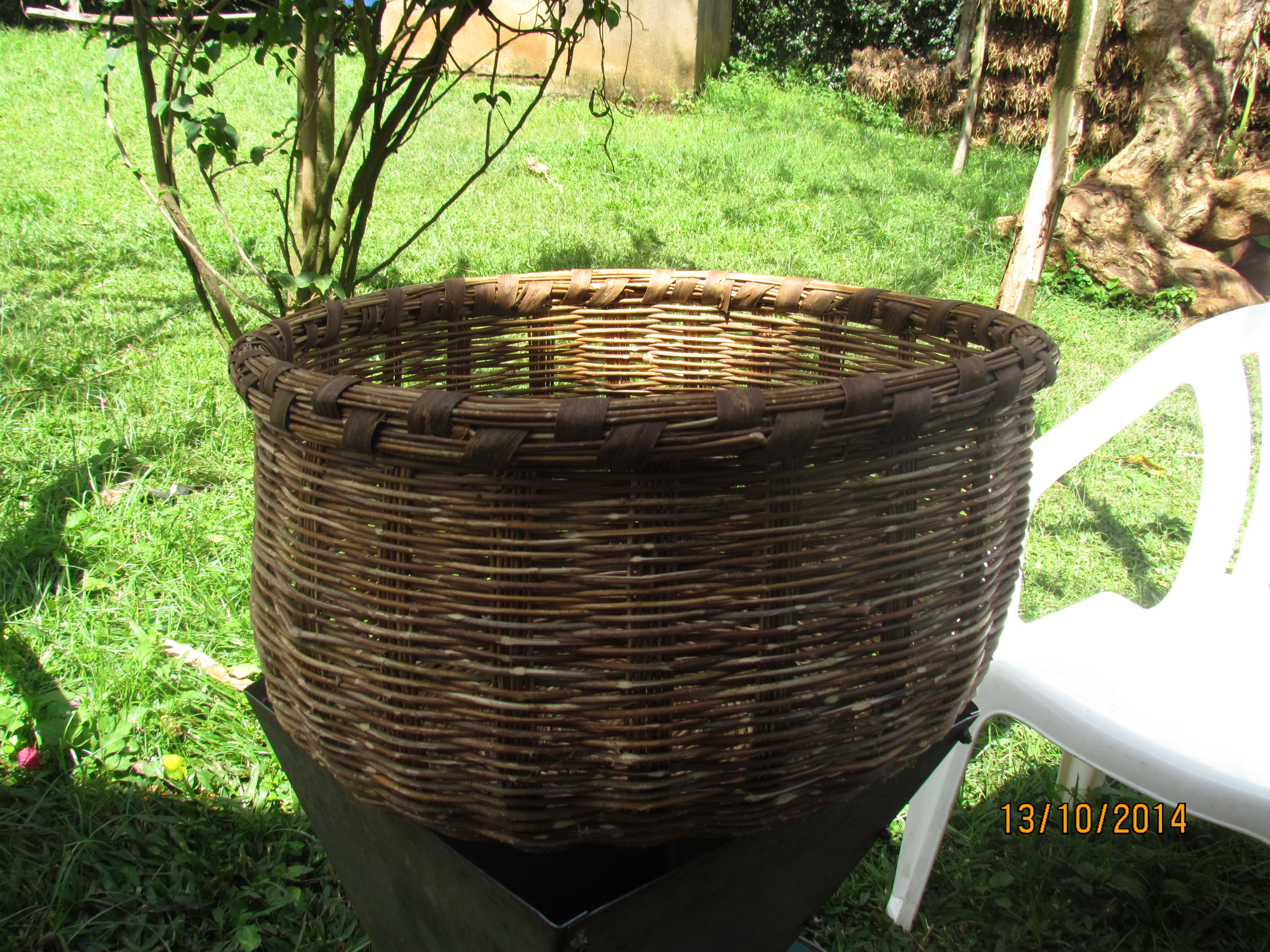
Washing basket

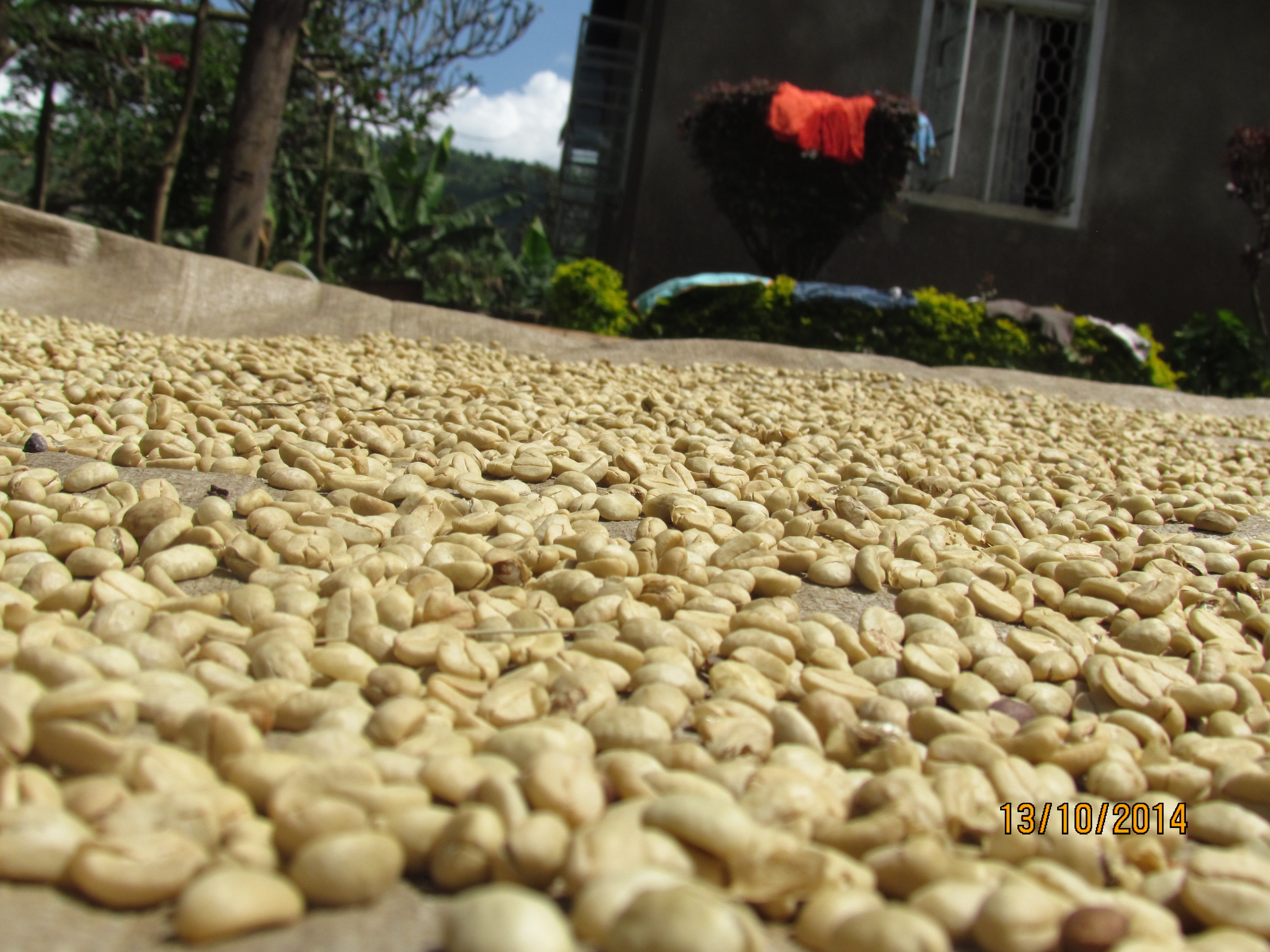
Dried coffee beans

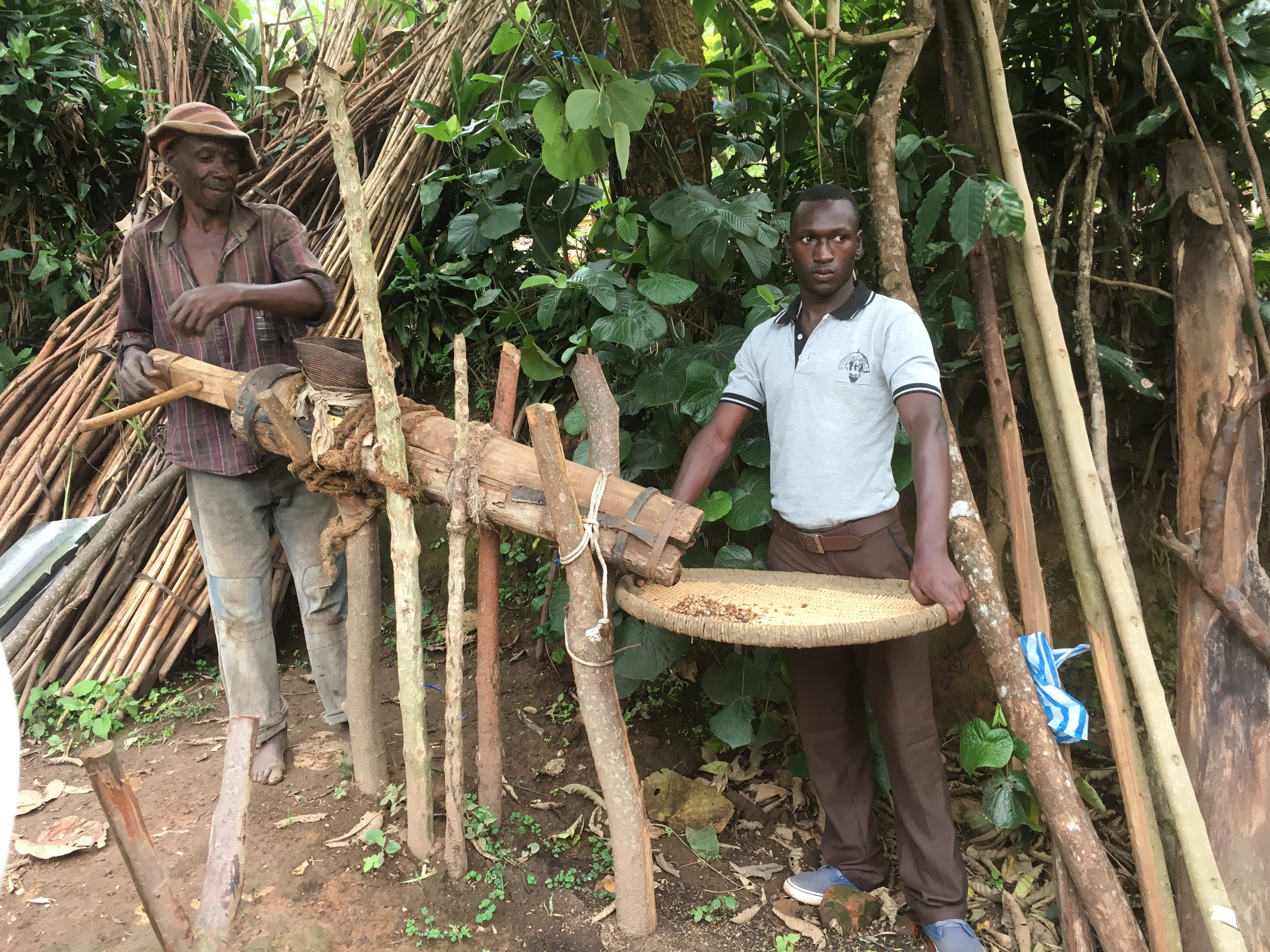
Grinding coffee

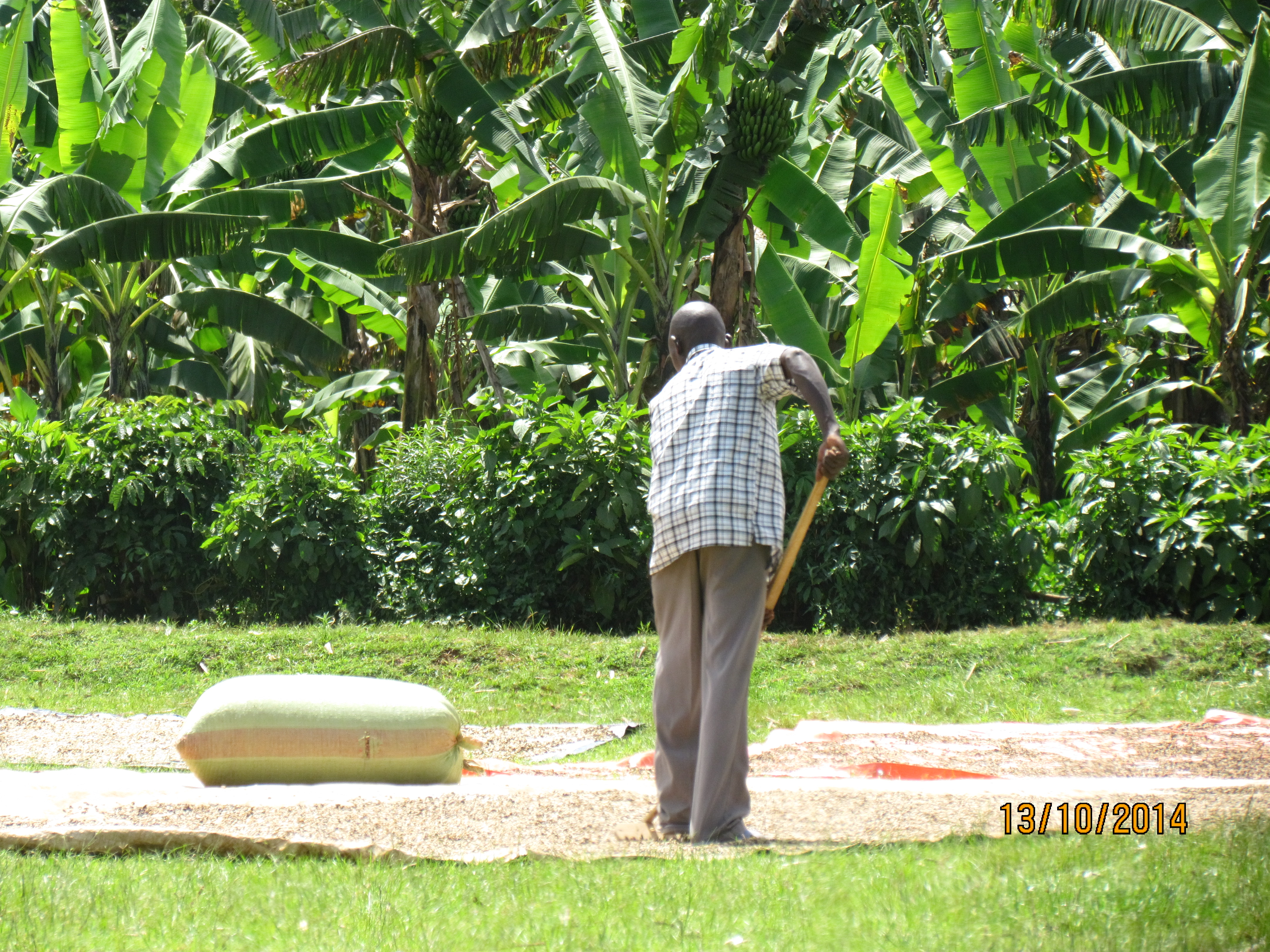
Packing coffee

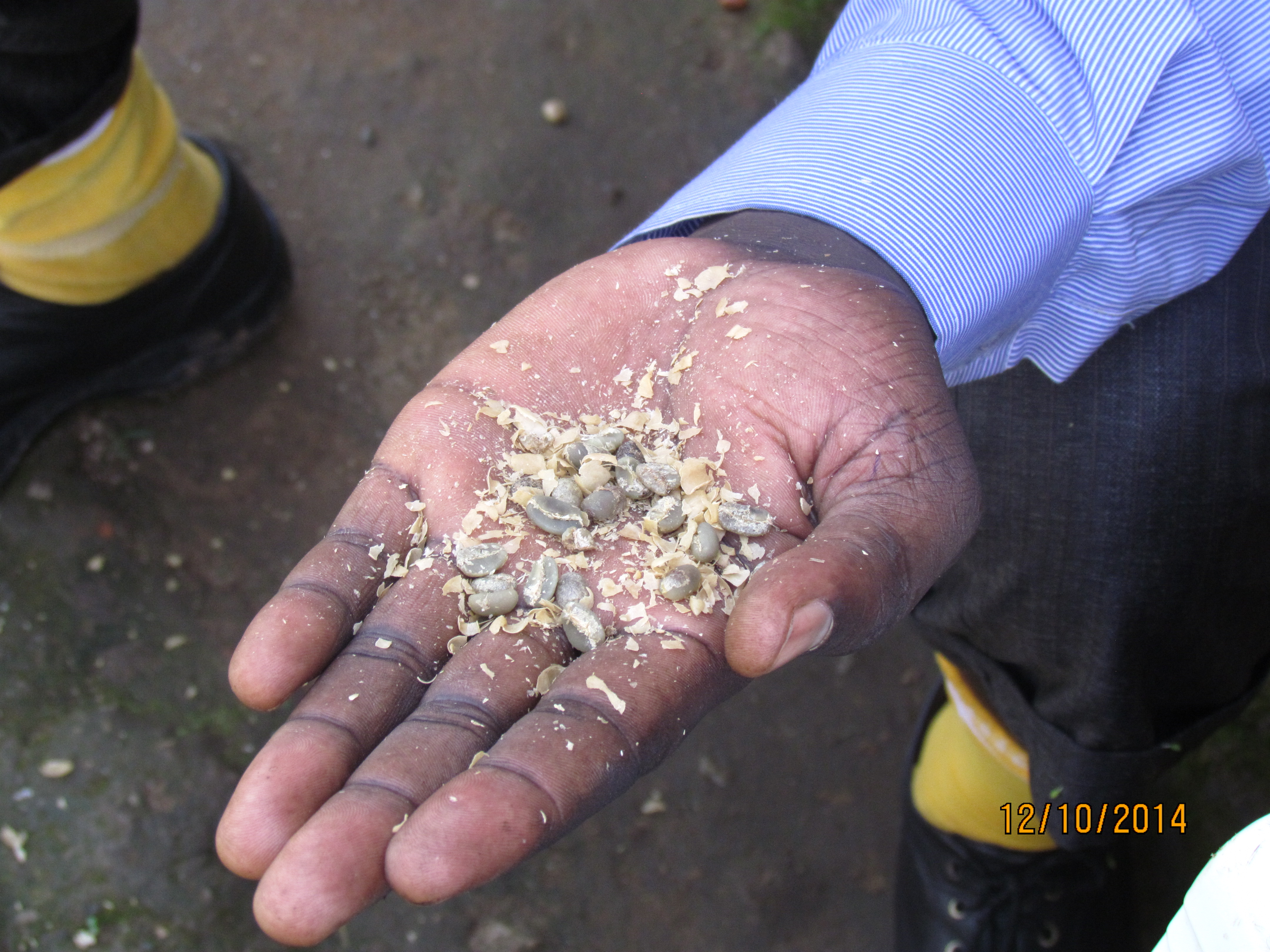
Coffee husks

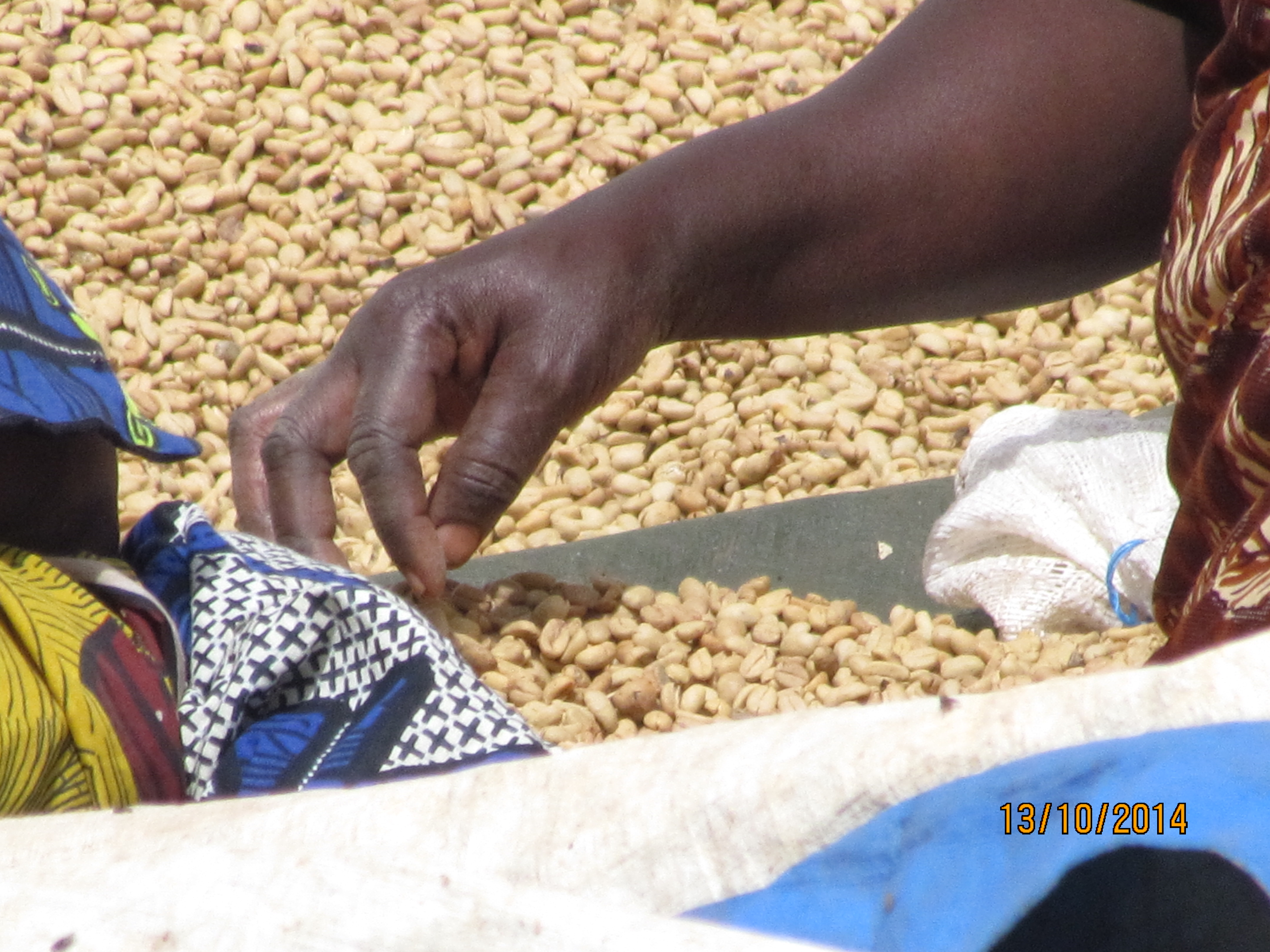
Sorting by hand picking

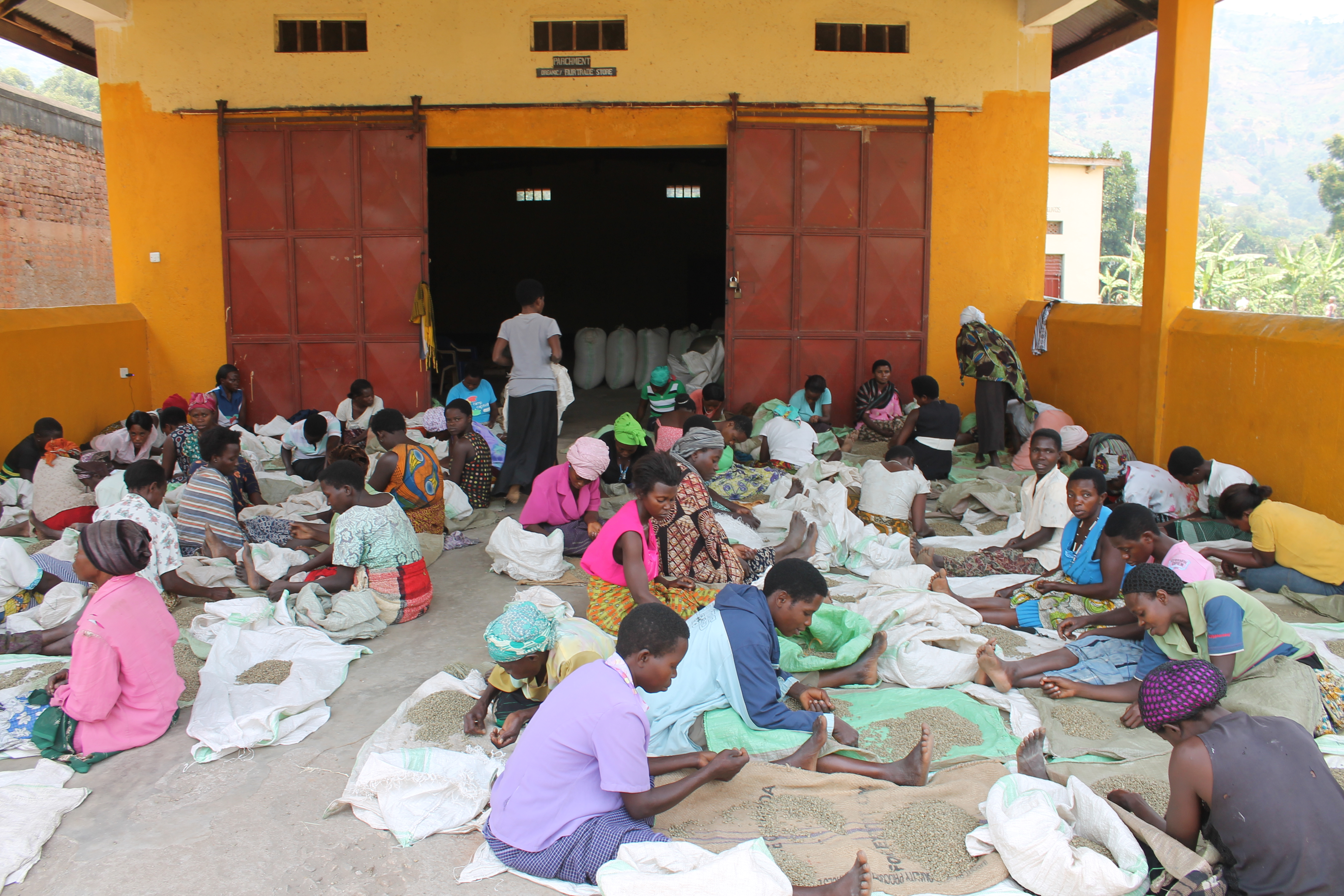
Women sorting coffee from Rwenzori Mountains

== Robusta production ==
Robusta coffee, which is made from the plant coffea canephora, mainly grows in the Lake Victoria Basin. It is known for low acidity and high bitterness in relation to coffee made from coffea arabica. Robusta beans tend to grow in lower altitudes than those of Arabica beans, ranging between 200–800 meters above sea level. It is also a more robust crop in terms of production because it generates more obtainable product per area than arabica does and the costs of harvesting its coffee beans is substantially lower than arabica. Another unique advantage of the robusta strain of the plant is its relative resilience to wilts and plant diseases, making it a less risky crop to rely on. However because of its high bitterness, it is considered to be a less popular on the global market in relation to arabica. However despite being a more plentiful crop that is resilient to disease, robusta coffee is particularly susceptible to climate change. Studies project that a 2 degree Celsius increase in temperature can severely reduce the amount of coffea canephora that can grow in Uganda.

== Kibale Wild Coffee Project ==
=== Purpose ===
Robusta coffee grows natively in the Kibale forest area. From 1999 to 2002 an effort was made to commercialize this coffee as a premium consumer brand, emulating and extending the success of shade grown in Central America. Revenue from the coffee production was intended to finance conservation management activities.

Initial funding for project development came from USAID. The project was implemented with funding from the Ford Foundation and $750,000 from the World Bank Global Environment Facility. The project had initial success in setting up local production standards, procedures, and control infrastructure. Initially it was led by the Uganda Coffee Trade Federation, until the independent US-based non-profit Kibale Forest Foundation was created to take over the project. The Kibale Forest Foundation, which was fully acknowledged and officiated by Uganda's government, was primarily tasked with inspecting the processes of wild coffee harvest and ensuring that the workers involved in this production were compensated. Compensation included both direct payment via wages as well as predetermined public projects, which were planned in accordance with community preferences. Sustainable annual yield was estimated at 1,500 pounds (680 kg).

Reducing gender inequality was another objective of the project. Women at the time were the bulk of the agricultural workforce, responsible for 50% of cash crop production, which includes coffee. Part of enforcing quality standards of coffee production chains in Uganda was to ensure that there were no more wage disparities between men and women.

Organic certification was delivered by the Swedish KRAV labeling firm ever since 1994. One method of organic certification was through the implementation of the Export Promotion of Organic Production Program (EPOPA), which provides assistance for achieving certification and establishing internal control systems (ICSs) for project marketing.

=== Dissolution ===
It was subsequently discovered that there was no demand for the product, as the robusta variety is perceived as inferior to arabica coffee typically demanded by the premium market. Various blending schemes were turned down by coffee distributors. Project leaders estimated that $800,000 in marketing expenditure would be required to create demand.

== See also ==
- Coffee production in Kenya
- Coffee production in Tanzania
- List of countries by coffee production
