= List of countries by agricultural exports =

This is a list of agricultural exports, which includes coffee, maize, rice, and wheat.

== Coffee ==
=== Export data ===
ICO export and re-export data

The ICO reports data on exports from its "exporting members" (and three non-members), as well as data on re-imports from "importing members". The United States is the only major re-exporting nation to also produce any significant amount of coffee domestically, around 3,100 tonnes in the United States proper and another 1,600 tonnes in Puerto Rico. The ICO reports another 45,200 tonnes of exports from other non-member countries but does not break down what those are; the largest unlisted producing nations are Guinea (200,000 tonnes produced in 2023), Laos (178,000), China (109,000), and Madagascar (49,300).

ITC export data

The ITC reports the total exports of all coffee products including roasted, ground, and instant coffee. Unlike the first table, this data includes both coffee produced by that country, and imported coffee which has been processed or packaged and then re-exported. Of the countries listed, ten are significant producers and the others primarily re-export coffee. The United States is the only major re-exporting nation to also produce any significant amount of coffee domestically, around 3,100 tonnes in the United States proper and another 1,600 tonnes in Puerto Rico. ITC figures are gross export values; many of the major re-exporting countries import significantly more coffee for domestic consumption. For example, the Netherlands exports $1.2bn of coffee, but buys more than it exports and so has a net trade deficit of $355m.

The ICO figures are often significantly different from those of the ITC; for example, the ICO lists Colombia as exporting 654,000 tonnes and Germany as (re-)exporting 757,000, while the equivalent ITC figures are 591,000 and 552,000 respectively. This is likely due to differences in data sources (official versus estimated outputs), measurement periods (the ICO reports February to January; the ITC the calendar year), and potentially in exactly what is being measured - roasted coffee beans will be around 20% lighter than an equivalent amount of green coffee beans, and instant coffee will be substantially lighter than beans or ground coffee.

=== Exports of coffee ===
The following is a list of countries by coffee exports, covering both exports of green coffee as well as re-exports of processed coffee. There is also a separate list of countries by coffee production. This table lists:

a) Total exports in 60kg bags and in ton equivalents, as reported by the International Coffee Organization (ICO) for the one-year period from March 2023 to February 2024, or re-exports in 60kg bags and in ton equivalents, as reported by the International Coffee Organization (ICO) for 2023; and
b) Total exports of coffee products in millions of United States dollars and in tons, as reported by the International Trade Centre for 2023.

Exports of coffee by country
Country	ICO exports, 2023-24		ITC all exports, 2023	
Country	60 kg bags	Metric tons	$m USD	Metric tons
Brazil	41,375,604	2,482,536	7,351	2,121,038
Vietnam	28,600,300	1,716,018	3,382	1,301,803
Germany	12,610,463	756,628	3,408	551,915
Colombia	10,897,760	653,866	2,915	591,665
India	6,484,415	389,065	747	233,332
Indonesia	6,200,363	372,022	929	279,996
Italy	6,072,027	364,321	2,586	304,821
Uganda	6,057,793	363,468	955	370,486
Honduras	5,182,124	310,927	1,488	343,208
Belgium	4,641,582	278,495	1,320	256,520
Netherlands	4,630,093	277,806	1,200	170,510
Peru	3,805,060	228,304	829	204,798
Ethiopia	3,588,531	215,312	1,225	236,076
Spain	3,248,515	194,911	419	62,556
United States	3,177,808	190,668	1,193	145,590
(Guatemala) Guatemala^{α}	3,096,888	185,813	949	182,384
Mexico	2,735,850	164,151	434	–
Nicaragua	2,611,778	156,707	609	140,378
Poland	2,256,642	135,399	539	72,014
Switzerland	2,151,167	129,070	3,644	102,682
France	1,817,463	109,048	1,271	61,086
Canada	–	–	764	81,325
United Kingdom	1,327,913	79,675	–	–
Tanzania	1,002,417	60,145	–	–
Papua New Guinea	999,998	60,000	–	–
Ivory Coast	931,296	55,878	–	–
Costa Rica	924,918	55,495	351	60,651
Czech Republic	814,475	48,869	–	–
Kenya	804,778	48,287	261	50,891
Ecuador	606,176	36,371	–	–
Sweden	559,430	33,566	–	–
El Salvador	441,115	26,467	–	–
Japan	303,134	18,188	–	–
Rwanda	272,250	16,335	–	–
Thailand	216,241	12,974	–	–
Russia	194,911	51,986	–	–
Democratic Republic of the Congo	183,500	11,010	–	–
Burundi	176,000	10,560	–	–
Cameroon	117,100	7,026	–	–
Zambia	99,890	5,993	–	–
(Timor-Leste) Timor Leste	91,862	5,512	–	–
Togo	60,000	3,600	–	–
(Dominican Republic) Dominican Republic^{α}	57,058	3,423	–	–
Yemen	52,900	3,174	–	–
Bolivia	39,737	2,384	–	–
Panama	34,716	2,083	–	–
Sierra Leone	28,000	1,680	–	–
Angola	20,770	1,246	–	–
Central African Republic	16,400	984	–	–
(Jamaica) Jamaica^{α}	14,619	877	–	–
Cuba	9,600	576	–	–
Malawi	8,480	509	–	–
Ghana	5,148	309	–	–
Philippines	2,677	161	–	–
Zimbabwe	2,200	132	–	–
Nepal	1,205	72	–	–
Madagascar	1,124	67	–	–

Notes

^α The Dominican Republic, Guatemala and Jamaica are not ICO members but have production reported by the ICO.

== Maize ==
The following is a list of countries by maize exports. Data is for 2022 as reported in Food and Agriculture Organization Corporate Statistical Database. Maize (corn) is one of the biggest crops in the international grain trade, alongside other crops like wheat, rice and soybean.

Country	Quantity (tonnes)	Value (thousands USD)
United States	458,595,338	319,031,565
Brazil	43,389,331	12,264,070
Argentina	35,409,335	9,260,947
Ukraine	25,176,653	5,992,448
Romania	5,539,733	1,954,566
France	5,156,373	2,346,255
Paraguay	4,598,420	1,088,661
South Africa	3,918,752	1,213,809
Poland	3,881,044	1,288,721
India	3,486,496	1,118,312

== Rice ==
The following is a list of countries by paddy rice exports. Data is for 2024 as reported in Food and Agriculture Organization Corporate Statistical Database. Rice is one of the biggest crops in the international grain trade, alongside other crops like wheat, maize (corn) and soybean.

Country	Quantity (tonnes)	Value (thousands USD)
India	17,877,117	11,647,536
Thailand	9,887,479	6,403,312
Vietnam	6,969,331	3,625,600
Pakistan	6,500,343	4,193,488
Cambodia	3,908,579	1,889,425
USA	3,143,664	2,437,712
Myanmar	2,606,898	1,343,724
China	1,276,492	889,874
Brazil	943,750	564,338
Uruguay	768,395	531,636

== Wheat ==
The following is a list of countries by wheat exports. Data is for 2023 as reported in Food and Agriculture Organization Corporate Statistical Database. Wheat is one of the biggest crops in the international grain trade, alongside other crops like maize (corn), rice and soybean.

Country	Quantity (tonnes)	Value (thousands USD)
Russia	31,599,104	9,184,005
Australia	29,292,038	9,276,804
Canada	25,571,109	8,839,931
United States	17,942,310	6,133,204
Ukraine	16,151,705	2,940,949
France	13,476,663	3,962,766
Romania	8,171,216	2,224,351
Kazakhstan	7,202,626	1,852,686
Poland	6,972,401	1,966,392
Germany	6,784,192	1,946,337
Ethiopia	6,124,192	1,046,157

== Sources ==
- atlas.media.mit.edu - Observatory of Economic complexity - Countries that export Coffee (2012)
- atlas.media.mit.edu - Observatory of Economic complexity - Countries that export Coffee (2016)
