= International commodity agreement =

An international commodity agreement is an undertaking by a group of countries to stabilize trade, supplies, and prices of a commodity for the benefit of participating countries. An agreement usually involves a consensus on quantities traded, prices, and stock management. A number of international commodity agreements serve solely as forums for information exchange, analysis, and policy discussion.

As of 2023, the United States participates in one commodity trade agreement: the International Tropical Timber Agreement. The agreement establishes an intergovernmental organization with a governing council. The Office of the United States Trade Representative leads US participation in this agreement.

== International Coffee Agreement ==
The International Coffee Organization (ICO) is the main intergovernmental organization for coffee. ICO exporting members account for more than 97% of world coffee production, and its importing Members, are responsible for around 80% of world coffee consumption. The ICO makes a practical contribution to the world coffee economy and to the improvement of living standards in developing countries by facilitating intergovernmental consultation and coordination regarding coffee policies and priorities, by encouraging a sustainable world coffee economy, by initiating coffee development projects to add value and improve marketing, by increasing world coffee consumption through innovative market development activities, by promoting the improvement of coffee quality, by working closely with the global coffee industry through a 16-member Private Sector Consultative Board, and by ensuring transparency in the coffee market with objective and comprehensive information on the world coffee sector by means of statistics and market studies.

The United States led efforts circa 2007 to renegotiate the ICA, resulting in the adoption of the seventh International Coffee Agreement (ICA 2007) by the International Coffee Council on September 28, 2007. The new ICA is designed to enhance the ICO's role as a forum for intergovernmental consultations, to increase its contributions to meaningful market information and market transparency, and to ensure that the organization plays a unique role in developing innovative and effective capacity building in the coffee sector. Among the features of the new agreement is a first-ever "Consultative Forum on Coffee Sector Finance" to promote the development and dissemination of innovations and best practices that can enable coffee producers to better manage financial aspects of the inherent volatility and risks associated with competitive and evolving markets. Other notable changes include expanding the organization's work in providing relevant statistical and market information and strengthening efforts to develop, review, and implement capacity building projects that are particularly important to small-scale farmers in key developing country trading partners.

== International Tropical Timber Agreement ==
The International Tropical Timber Agreement (ITTA) is often described as a "hybrid" agreement because it combines a traditional commodity trade agreement with objectives that include sustainable management of tropical forests. The ITTA established the International Tropical Timber Organization (ITTO), an intergovernmental organization with 59 members who collectively account for about 80% of the world's tropical forests and 90% of the annual trade in tropical timber trade. The ITTO promotes market transparency by collecting, analyzing and disseminating data on the production and trade of tropical timber; assists in developing, funding and implementing projects and other activities to build capacity to sustainably manage and use tropical forests; and facilitates intergovernmental consultation and international co-operation on issues relating to the trade and utilization of tropical timber and the sustainable management of its resource base.

Negotiations for a successor agreement to the ITTA 1994 were concluded in 2006, and the new agreement (ITTA 2006) is expected to further strengthen efforts to promote tropical timber trade in the context of sustainable management of tropical forests.
