= Coffee production in Cameroon =

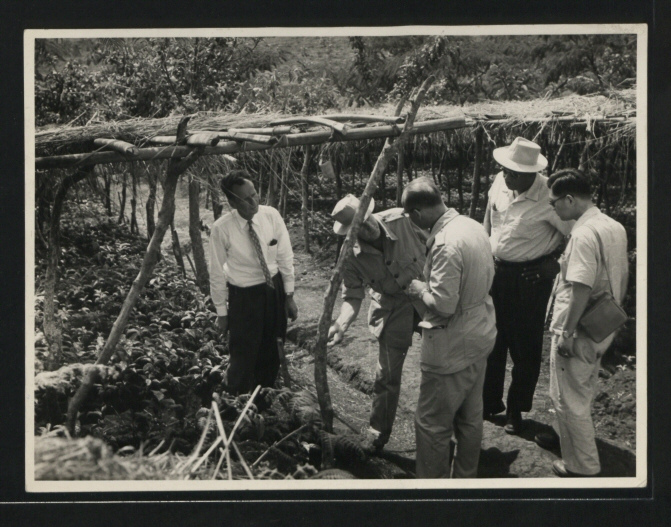
Santa Coffee Estate in Bamenda

Coffee production is important to the economy of Cameroon. The crop is grown extensively in the country, with robusta more prevalent in the coastal areas and arabica more widespread in the western highlands. The two varieties of arabica cultivated are Java and Jamaïca of which only Java is resistant to pests such as coffee berry disease and rust. In 2014, Cameroon was ranked the 31st largest producer of coffee in world.

== History ==
Coffee farming in Cameroon dates to 1884, during the German colonial era. The Germans went up to open trial gardens in Victoria, Ebolowa, Nkongsamba and Dschang. Coffee farming later extended to the hinterlands to Yokadouma, Abong-Mbang, Doumé, Lomié and Akonolinga. Around 1927, the coffee plant found its way to the West Region. By 1928, 200,000 coffee seedlings were planted in Dschang. By 1929, the development of coffee farming in Cameroon was thanks to René COSTE, a French Agricultural Engineer appointed to head the farming Station of Dschang. There was a high level of production in 1990 resulting in record export of 156,000 tons. Cameroon was ranked 12th in world ranking. When the production declined, it was attributed to the policies of the government and to the global economic crisis. The government has sought the help of Brazilian experts to suggest solutions, and it has also invested 750 million FCFA – about US$1.5 million for a five-year period as a relief package.

== Production ==
Coffee is grown in seven regions of Cameroon; West, Northwest, Littoral, Southwest, South, Centre and East Region. Bamileke and Bamaoun are the high plateau areas where arabica plantations are located. Robusta, which is a more dominant crop of the country, is grown in middle elevations in western region and also to some degree in Abang Mbang. Arabica and robusta are partly processed within the country. The production of Cameroon's coffee is placed under the responsibility of the Ministries of Agriculture and Rural Development (MINADER) and that of Scientific Research and Innovations (MINRESI). Under these ministries there are various projects to boost coffee production. According to the United Nations FAO statistics, coffee production in 2013 was 41,800 tons in an area of 212,000 hectares (520,000 acres) with a yield rate of 1.972 hectogram per ha. During the year 2007–08, over 40% of total export was of green coffee to Italy. Robusta was exported to Belgium, Portugal and France. During the same period 70% of the export of arabica was to Germany. Arabica was also exported to the US, Italy and Belgium.

Under the Coffee Sector Development Strategy for 2010–2015, production was aimed at 125,000 tons comprising 25,000 tons of arabica and 100,000 tons of robusta. The export was targeted to achieve 80,000 tons (15,000 tons of arabica and 65,000 tons of robusta). Domestic consumption was gauged at 10,000 tons of green coffee.

== Trade ==
The marketing of Coffee in Cameroon is placed under the control of the National Cocoa and Coffee Board (NCCB), an autonomous government institution under the technical supervision of the Ministry of Trade (MINCOMMERCE). Over the years, coffee marketing has witnessed a sharp decline owing to the liberalization of the sector in the early 1990s. In 2014, Cameroon traded 32 808 tonnes of its production. The most active exporters of coffee in Cameroon include Olam-Cameroon Olam (a subsidiary of OlamInternational Limited), UTI (Union trading international), UCCAO (Union Centrale des Cooperatives Agricole de l'Ouest), NWCA (North West Cooperative Association), (NEALIKO), Hilltop Dynamics, Alpine Coffee Limited.

== Relaunch of the sector ==
On September 30, 2014, the government of Cameroon validated and launched a new plan to revive the coffee sector, hoping to boost production; Robusta Coffee to 120,000 tonnes and Arabica coffee to 35,000 tonnes by 2020. This was marked by a 100% increase in export levies on coffee to finance the project.

== See also ==
- Agriculture in Cameroon
- List of countries by coffee production

== Bibliography ==
- Belda, Pascal (2006). Cameroon. EBizguides. ISBN 978-84-933978-5-2.
- DeLancey, Mark Dike; Mbuh, Rebecca; Delancey, Mark W. (3 May 2010). Historical Dictionary of the Republic of Cameroon. Scarecrow Press. ISBN 978-0-8108-7399-5.
- Waller, J. M.; Bigger, M.; Hillocks, R. J. (2007). Coffee Pests, Diseases and Their Management. CAB International. ISBN 978-1-84593-209-1.
