= Seoul International Cafe Show =

Seoul International Cafe Show is an annual coffee, tea, bakery and dessert event held at the COEX Convention & Exhibition Center in November in Gangnam District, Seoul, South Korea. It also showcases coffee making and roasting equipment. In 2013, MOU signed between International Coffee Organization and Seoul International Cafe Show. As of 2020, it is Asia's number one coffee event and is recognized by the coffee industry globally.

== Show dates ==
- The 2002 show was held 16–19 November.
- The 2003 show was held 13–16 November.
- The 2004 show was held 4–7 November.
- The 2005 show was held 10–13 November.
- The 2006 show was held 16–19 November.
- The 2007 show was held 29 November to 2 December.
- The 2008 show was held 27–30 November.
- The 2009 show was held 26–29 November.
- The 2010 show was held 25–28 November.
- The 2011 show was held 24–27 November.
- The 2012 show was held 22–25 November.
- The 2013 show was held 21–24 November.
- The 2014 show was held 20–23 November.
- The 2015 show was held 12–15 November.
- The 2016 show was held 10–13 November.
- The 2017 show was held 9–12 November.
- The 2018 show was held 8–11 November.
- The 2019 show was held 7–10 November.
- The 2020 show was held 4–7 November.
- The 2021 show was held 10–13 November.
- The 2022 show was held 23–26 November.
- The 2023 show was held 8–11 November.
- The 2024 show was held 6-9 November.
