= Coffee production in Angola =

Coffee production in Angola refers to the production of coffee in Angola. Coffee is one of Angola's largest agricultural products; at its peak, while under Portuguese rule, Angola was the third-largest producer of coffee in the world.

== History ==
Plantation and production of coffee contributed largely to the economy of Angola's northwestern area, including the Uíge Province. Coffee production was started by the Portuguese in the 1830s and soon became a cash crop; the first commercial coffee plantation in Angola was started by a Brazilian farmer in 1837. The most common crop grown on approximately 2,000 Angolan plantations, owned mostly by the Portuguese, was robusta coffee. In the early 1970s, Angola was the third largest coffee-producing country in the world. However, the civil war that followed the Portuguese rule devastated a large number of coffee plantations. With most coffee agronomists migrating to Brazil, coffee plants grown on plantations became wild bushes. Rehabilitation of the plantations has been ongoing since 2000, but the investment required to replace the 40-year-old unproductive plants are estimated to be US$230 million. With the opening up of new roads, industrial activity in the province is taking shape.

== Production ==
The Angola National Institute of Coffee (INCA) has three research stations, mainly responsible for producing and distributing robusta seedlings, in Gabela, Kwanza Sul, and Uige; however, due to wartime damage, only one of them is functional. Actual coffee production predominantly occurs in Uige, Kwanza Norte, Kwanza Sul, Bengo, and Cabinda. Production of arabica coffee, which accounts for some 5% of Angola's coffee exports, takes place in Benguela, Bie, Huambo, Huila, and Moxico. Angola had its highest level of coffee production in 1973, recording a total yield of 209,000 tonnes (206,000 long tons; 230,000 short tons). According to a 2000 study by the International Coffee Organization, coffee production's contribution to the economy in Angola is negligible; coffee exports in 1997 accounted for only $5 million, with total exports valued at $4,626 million.

== Regulation ==
The coffee industry in Angola is monitored and regulated by the Secretary of State for Coffee through the Secretariat of Coffee (established 1988), which in turn tasks INCA to oversee production on the ground. All coffee producers must obtain a license valued at around $40 and prove that they have the prerequisites to properly produce coffee, including having the capital to handle at least 15 tonnes (15 long tons; 17 short tons) of coffee and a serviceable warehouse.

== See also ==
- List of countries by coffee production
