= Coffee production in Panama =

Coffee production in Panama was occurring in the Boquete Valley by the early 20th century, although coffee was growing wild all over the Pacific coast region of Panama by this time, when production did not match domestic consumption. The International Coffee Organization (ICO) has grouped mild arabica as the variety of coffee that is grown in Panama. The best quality of coffee in Panama is grown in Boquete. In the Coffee Review of 2008, two Panamanian coffees have received higher rating and fetched record prices than the coffee from Costa Rica. This is mainly due to the unprecedented success of the Geisha varietal. This varietal originated from and arrived via Tanzania and Costa Rica in the 1960s in Panama. But only in 2004, its outstanding taste profile was recognized. In 2019 one pound of Panama Geisha beans fetched $1,029 in an auction.

== Plantations ==
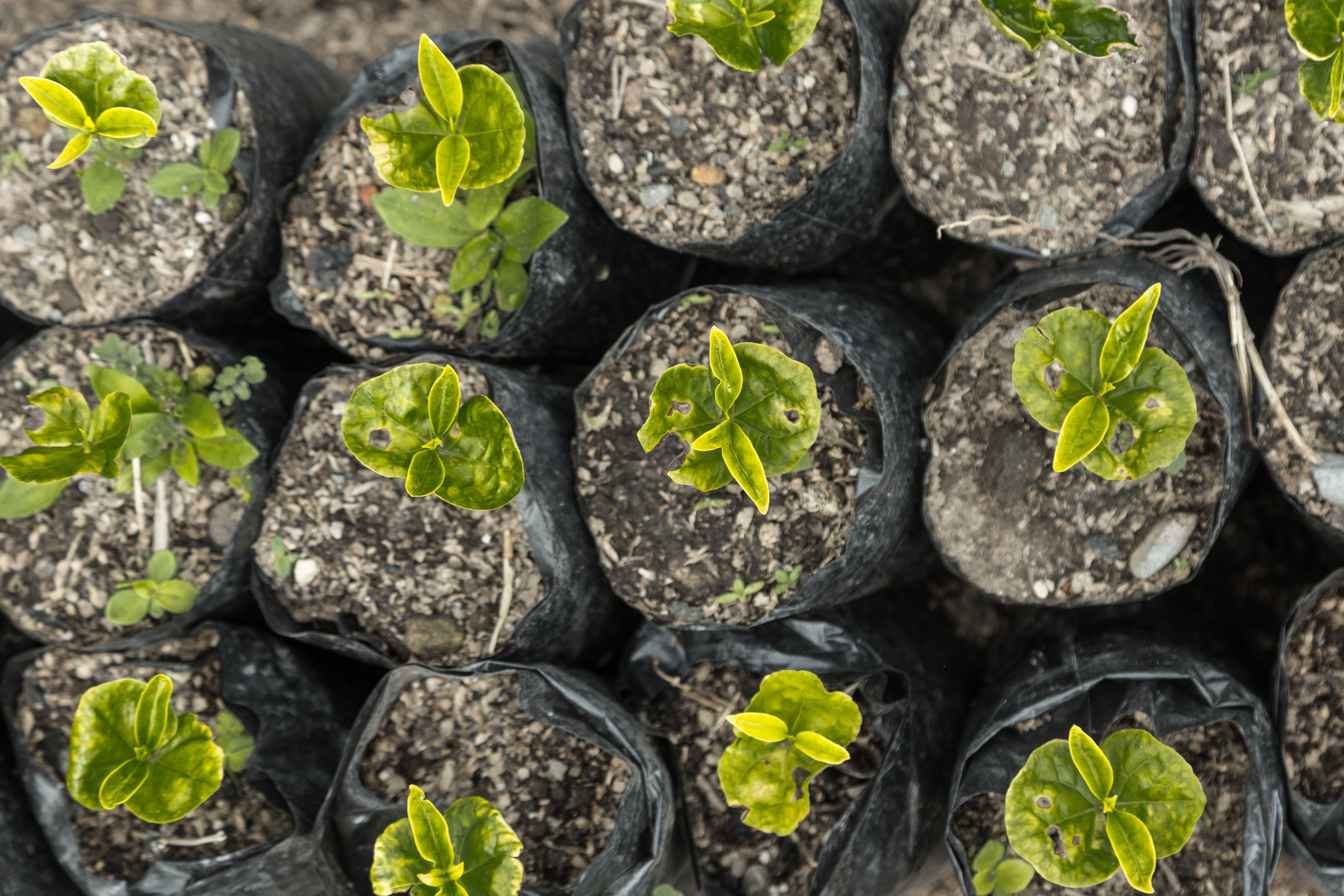
Coffee Plantation in Boquete

The coffee varieties grown are 82 percent arabica and 18 percent robusta. Arabica coffee, grown in the Chiriquí highlands at an elevation range of 2,300–3,500 feet (700–1,070 m), is considered the highest quality of Panamanian coffee. The coffee produced here is said to be of a sharp taste, fragrant, with a mild degree of acidity. Among the estates producing coffee, the Café Ruiz is said to be one of the oldest and most regarded. Café Kotowa (Kotowa means "mountain"), a producer of boutique coffee, was established more than 100 years ago by a Scottish immigrant. Boquete has the largest coffee production factory in the country. Another notable plantation is the La Torcaza Estate, which is at an elevation of 1,350 m in the southern slopes of Volcan Baru. It is an organically tended plantation where natural microorganisms are used.

== Production ==
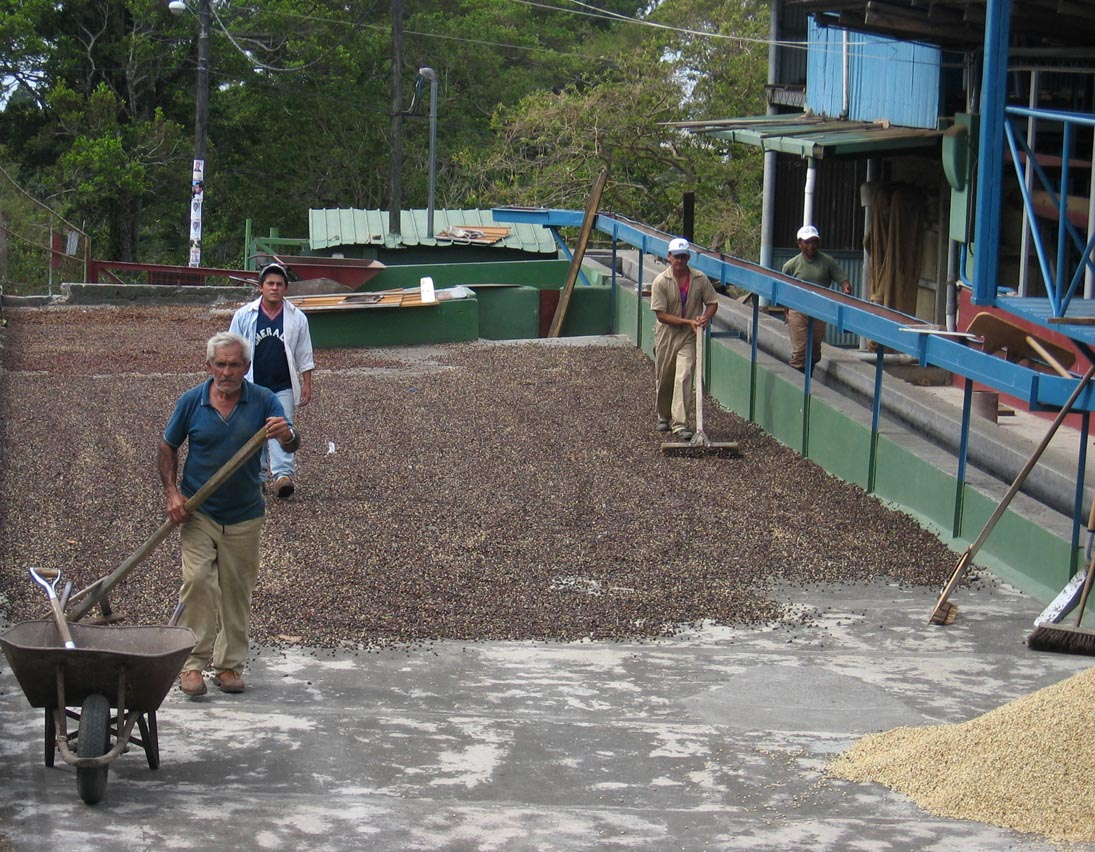
Traditional coffee-drying at the Alto Boquete plant of Cafe Ruiz

In 2013, according to FAO statistics, coffee production in the country was 10,100 tons which was about 0.1% of the world production. It was grown in an area of 22,400 hectares (55,000 acres) with a yield of 4,509 hectograms per ha. Coffee production statistics for the period 1961 to 2015 indicate a low of 402 tons in 1961 to 1,422 tons in 1985, and in 2014 it was 510 tons. The indigenous groups known as Ngäbe and Buglé, who reside in the Chiriquí and Bocas del Toro provinces, are dependent on coffee production for their sustenance.

The Panamanian government ensures protection to coffee plants and crops from the effect of pests as it is one of the prime crops of export. In 2013, the pests that severely affected coffee plantations in an area of 20,097 hectares (49,660 acres) were Coffee Rust (Hemilieia vastatrix), Ojo de Gallo (Mycena citricolor) and Coffee Borer Beetle (Hypothenemus hampei).

== See also ==
- List of countries by coffee production

== Bibliography ==
- Baker, Christopher P.; Mingasson, Gilles (January 2007). Panama. National Geographic Society. ISBN 978-1-4262-0146-2.
- Schreck, Kristina (19 March 2007). Frommer's Panama. John Wiley & Sons. ISBN 978-0-470-11887-0.
- Wood, Donald (9 April 2009). Economic Development, Integration, and Morality in Asia and the Americas. Emerald Group Publishing. ISBN 978-1-84855-543-3.
- Woods, Sarah (2005). Panama. Bradt Travel Guides. p. 215. ISBN 978-1-84162-117-3.
