= Economics of coffee =

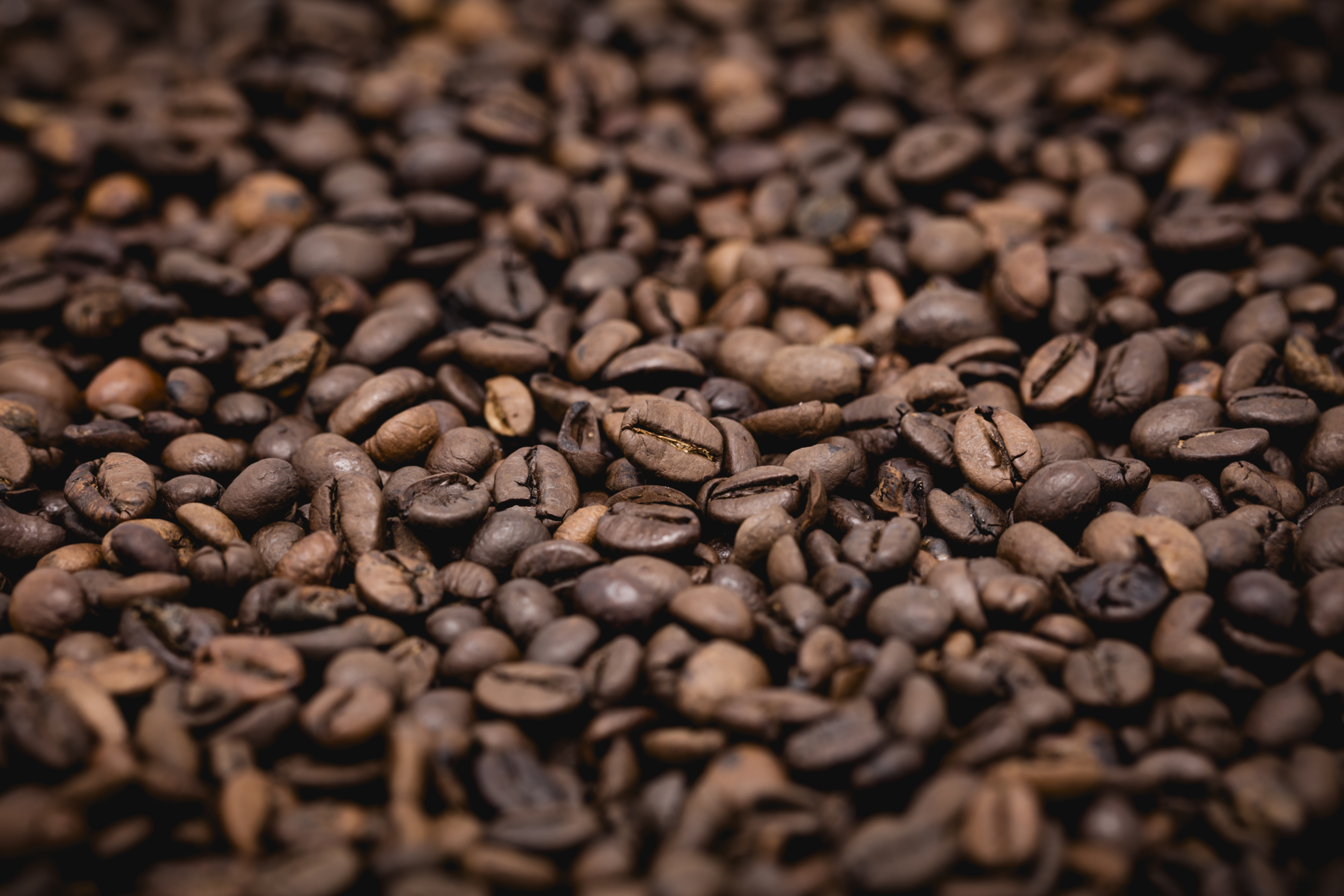
Coffee beans

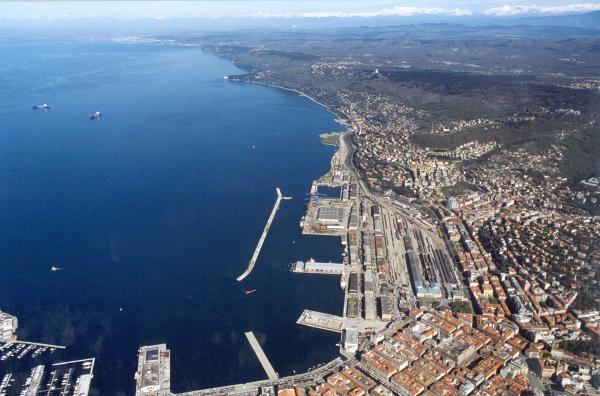
The old port of Trieste where most of the coffee for Central Europe was handled for a long time

Coffee is a popular beverage and an important agricultural product. Tens of millions of small producers in developing countries make their living growing coffee. Over 2.25 billion cups of coffee are consumed in the world daily. Over 90 percent of coffee production takes place in developing countries — mainly South America — while consumption happens primarily in industrialized economies. There are 25 million small producers who rely on coffee for a living worldwide. In Brazil, where almost a third of the world's coffee is produced, over five million people are employed in the cultivation and harvesting of over three billion coffee plants; it is a more labor-intensive culture than alternative cultures of the same regions, such as sugar cane or cattle, as its cultivation is not automated, requiring frequent human attention.

Coffee is a major export commodity and was the top agricultural export for 12 countries in 2004; the world's seventh-largest legal agricultural export, by value, in 2005; and "the second most valuable commodity exported by developing countries," from 1970 to circa 2000, which is frequently misstated — see coffee commodity market. Unroasted, or green, coffee beans comprise one of the most traded agricultural commodities in the world; the commodity is traded in futures contracts on many exchanges, including the New York Board of Trade, New York Mercantile Exchange, New York Intercontinental Exchange. Important trading and processing centers for coffee in Europe are Hamburg and Trieste.

== World production ==
Coffee bean production

Top Ten Green Coffee Producers – 2023 (millions of metric tons)
Brazil	3.41
Vietnam	1.96
Indonesia	0.76
Colombia	0.68
Ethiopia	0.56
Honduras	0.38
Uganda	0.38
Peru	0.37
India	0.33
Central African Republic	0.32
World Total	11.1
Source: UN Food and Agriculture Organization (FAO)

At least 20 to 25 million families around the world make a living from growing coffee. With an assumed average family size of five people, more than 100 million people are dependent on coffee growing.

Global production in 2023 was 11.1 million tonnes; Brazil was the world leader in production of green coffee, followed by Vietnam, Indonesia, Colombia and Ethiopia. 51% of the world's coffee is cultivated in South and Central America, with 27% in south-east Asia and 17% in Africa. Arabica coffee beans are cultivated in Latin America, eastern Africa, Arabia, or Asia. Robusta coffee beans are grown in western and central Africa, throughout southeast Asia, and to some extent in Brazil.

Beans from different countries or regions can usually be distinguished by differences in flavor, aroma, body, acidity and girth (texture) These taste characteristics are dependent not only on the coffee's growing region, but also on genetic subspecies (varietals) and processing. Varietals are generally known by the region in which they are grown, such as Colombian, Java and Kona.

In 2016, global coffee exports were $19.4 billion. Coffee is not the second most important commercial product in the world after petroleum, but it is the second most important commercial product that is exported by developing countries. For some countries like East Timor, this is the only export item worth mentioning. Coffee sales fluctuate strongly: for example, they fell from 14 billion US dollars in 1986 to 4.9 billion US dollars in the crisis year 2001/2002. This so-called coffee crisis lasted for several years, with consequences for coffee producers worldwide.

== Consumption ==
The way coffee is prepared and consumed varies depending on culture, and manifests itself in different habits within the world. The varieties of coffee consumed vary also, with the two main varieties being Arabica and Robusta, with Arabica generally taking up most of the consumption.

== Pricing ==
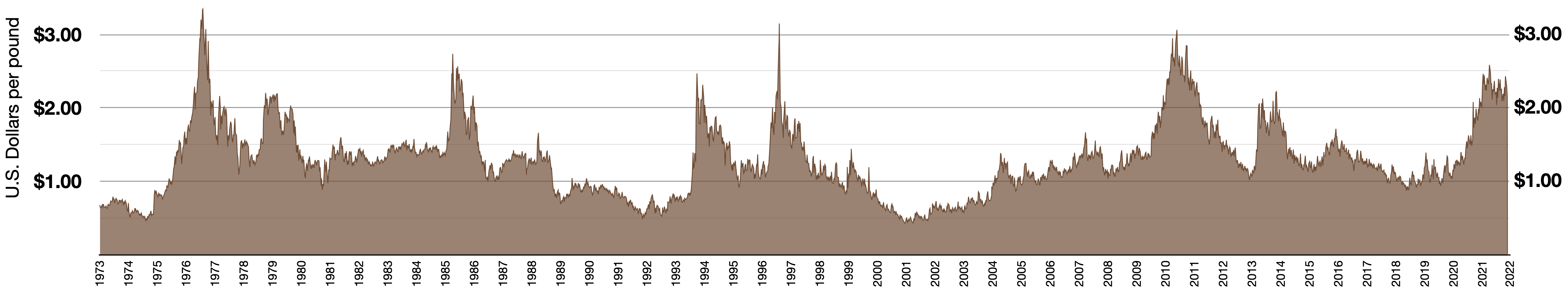
Coffee prices 1973–2022

According to the Composite Index of the London-based coffee export country group International Coffee Organization the monthly coffee price averages in international trade had been well above 1000 US cent/lb during the 1920s and 1980s, but then declined during the late 1990s reaching a minimum in September 2001 of just 417 US cent per lb and stayed low until 2004. The reasons for this decline included a collapse of the International Coffee Agreement of 1962–1989 with Cold War pressures, which had held the minimum coffee price at US$1.20 per pound.

The expansion of Brazilian coffee plantations and Vietnam's entry into the market in 1994, when the United States trade embargo against it was lifted added supply pressures to growers. The market awarded the more affordable Vietnamese coffee suppliers with trade and caused less efficient coffee bean farmers in many countries such as Brazil, Nicaragua, and Ethiopia not to be able to live off of their products, which at many times were priced below the cost of production, forcing many to quit the coffee bean production and move into slums in the cities. (Mai, 2006).

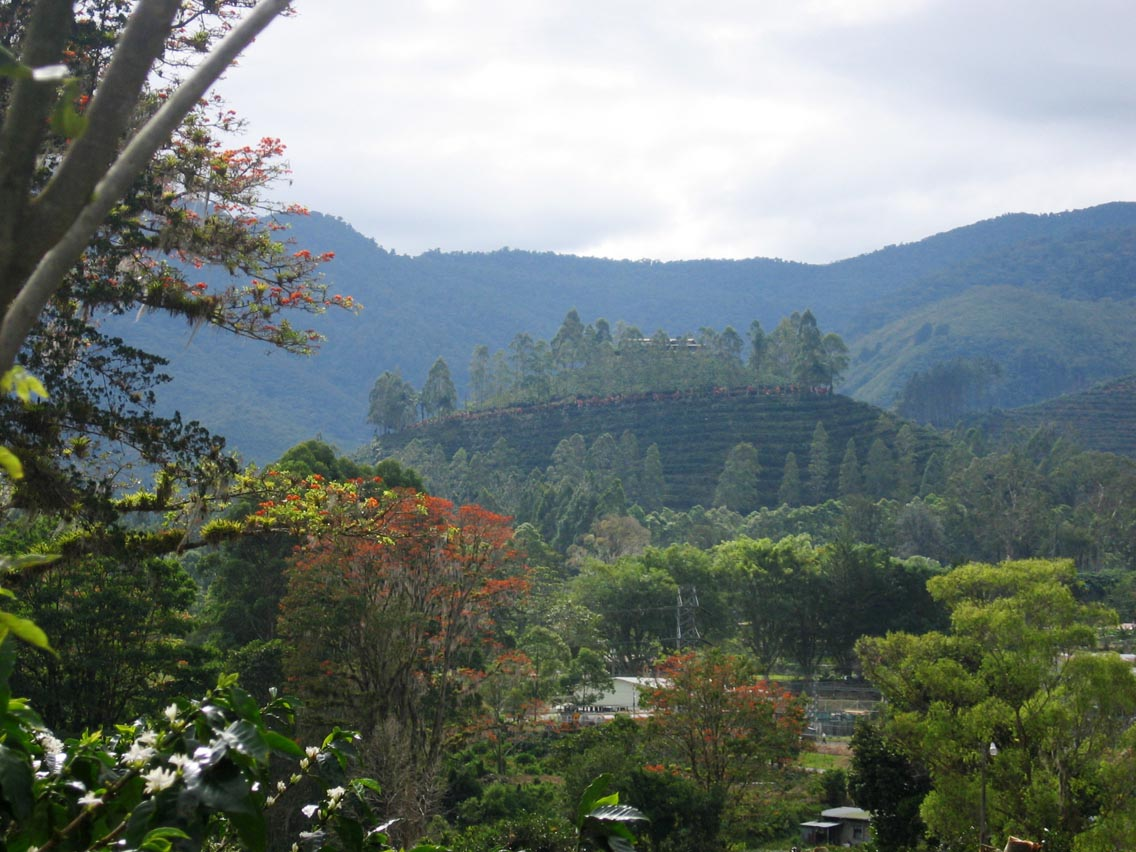
A coffee plantation on a hill near Orosí, Costa Rica

The decline in the ingredient cost of green coffee, while not the only cost component of the final cup being served, occurred at the same time as the rise in popularity specialty cafés, which sold their beverages at unprecedented high prices. According to the Specialty Coffee Association of America, in 2004 16 percent of adults in the United States drank specialty coffee daily; the number of retail specialty coffee locations, including cafés, kiosks, coffee carts and retail roasters, amounted to 17,400 and total sales were $8.96 billion in 2003.

Specialty coffee, however, is frequently not purchased on commodities exchanges — for example, Starbucks purchases nearly all its coffee through multi-year, private contracts that often pay double the commodity price. It is also important to note that the coffee sold at retail is a different economic product than wholesale coffee traded as a commodity, which becomes an input to the various ultimate end products so that its market is ultimately affected by changes in consumption patterns and prices.

In 2005, however, the coffee prices rose (with the above-mentioned ICO Composite Index monthly averages between 78.79 (September) and 101.44 (March) US Cent per lb). This rise was likely caused by an increase in consumption in Russia and China as well as a harvest which was about 10 to 20 percent lower than that in the record years before. Many coffee bean farmers can now live off their products, but not all of the extra-surplus trickles down to them, because rising petroleum prices make the transportation, roasting and packaging of the coffee beans more expensive. Prices have risen from 2005 to 2009 and sharply in the second half of 2010 on fears of a bad harvest in key coffee-producing countries, with the ICO indicator price reaching 231 in March 2011.

== Classification ==
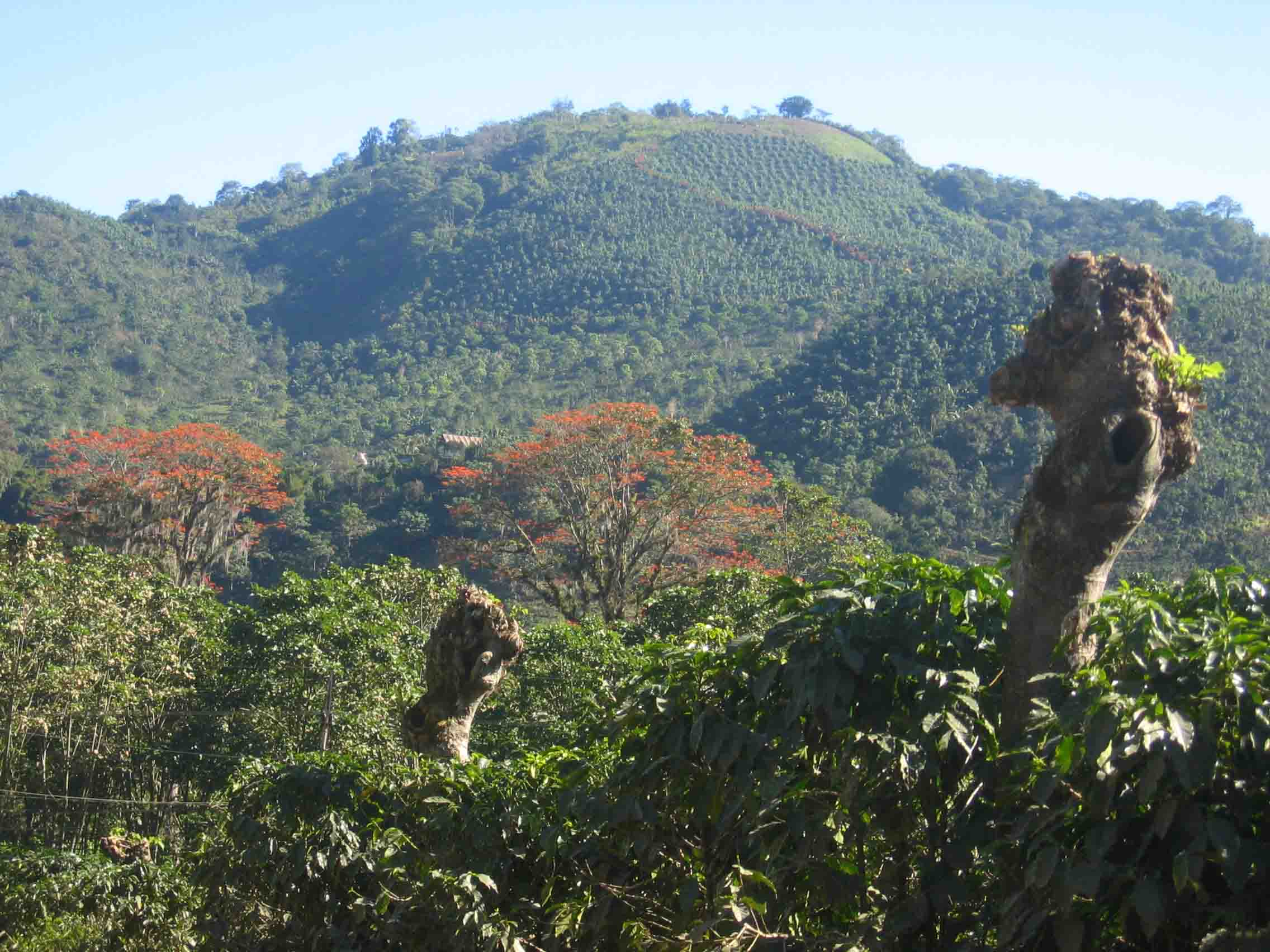
Shade trees in Orosí in Costa Rica. In the background (red) shade trees and in the foreground pruned trees for different periods in the growth cycle.

A number of classifications are used to label coffee produced under certain environmental or labor standards. For instance, "Bird-Friendly" or "shade-grown coffee" is said to be produced in regions where natural shade (canopy trees) is used to shelter coffee plants during parts of the growing season.

Fair trade coffee is produced by small coffee producers who belong to cooperatives; guaranteeing for these cooperatives a minimum price, though with historically low prices, current fair-trade minimums are lower than the market price of only a few years ago. Fairtrade America is the primary organization currently overseeing Fair Trade coffee practices in the United States, while the Fairtrade Foundation does so in the United Kingdom.

== Commodity chain for the coffee industry ==
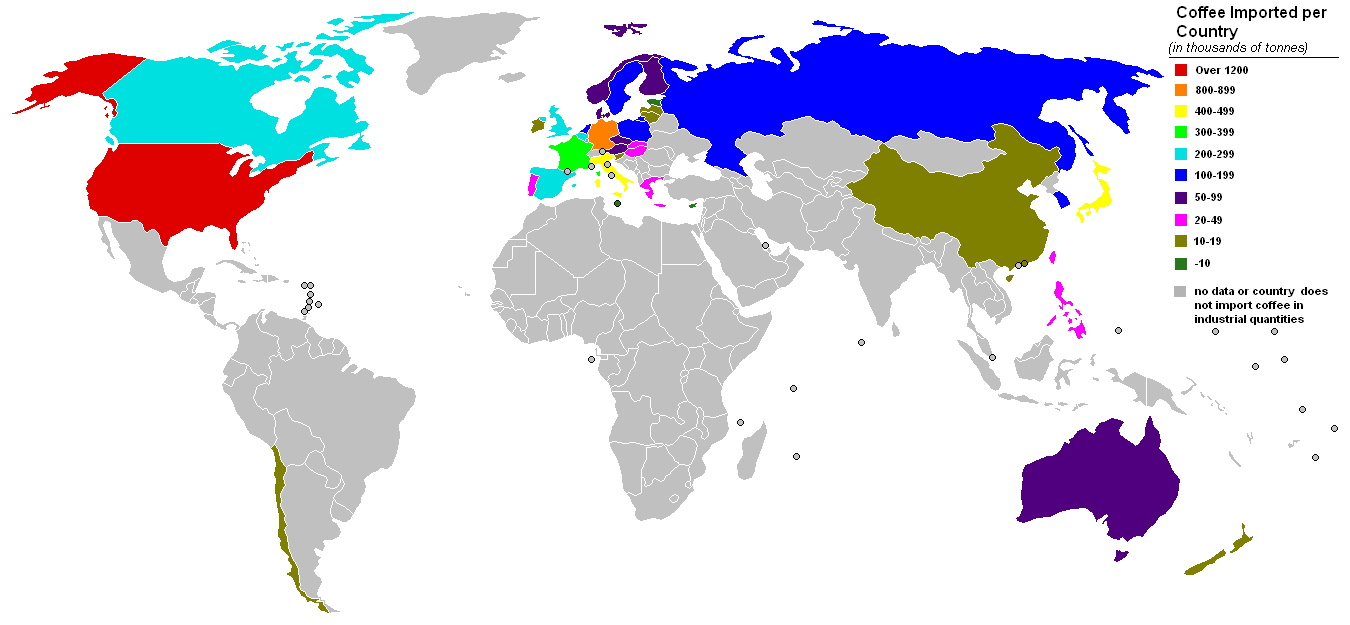
World Map based on Coffee imported by country in 2005. Map shows gross imports, not how much coffee stays within the country or how much is consumed. Some countries re-export significant portions of their coffee imported.

The coffee industry currently has a commodity chain that involves producers, middlemen exporters, importers, roasters, and retailers before reaching the consumer. Middlemen exporters, often referred to as coffee "coyotes", purchase coffee directly from small farmers. Large coffee estates and plantations often export their own harvests or have direct arrangements with a transnational coffee processing or distributing company. Under either arrangement, large producers can sell at prices set by the New York Coffee Exchange.

Green coffee is then purchased by importers from exporters or large plantation owners. Importers hold inventory of large container loads, which they sell gradually through numerous small orders. They have capital resources to obtain quality coffee from around the world, capital normal roasters do not have. Roasters' heavy reliance on importers gives the importers great influence over the types of coffee that are sold to consumers.

In the United States, there are around 1,200 roasters. Roasters have the highest profit margin in the commodity chain. Large roasters normally sell pre-packaged coffee to large retailers, such as Maxwell House, Folgers and Millstone.

Coffee reaches the consumers through cafes and specialty stores selling coffee, of which, approximately, 30 percent are chains, and through supermarkets and traditional retail chains. Supermarkets and traditional retail chains hold about 60 percent of market share and are the primary channel for both specialty coffee and non-specialty coffee. Twelve billion pounds of coffee is consumed around the globe annually, and the United States alone has over 130 million coffee drinkers.

Coffee is also bought and sold by investors and price speculators as a tradable commodity. Coffee Arabica futures contracts are traded on the New York Board of Trade (NYBOT) under ticker symbol KC with contract deliveries occurring every year in March, May, July, September, and December. Coffee Robusta futures are traded on ICE London (Liffe) under ticker symbol RC with contract deliveries occurring every year in January, March, May, July, September and November.

== Coffee and the environment ==
Originally, coffee farming was done in the shade of trees, which provided natural habitat for many animals and insects, roughly approximating the biodiversity of a natural forest. These traditional farmers used compost of coffee pulp and excluded chemicals and fertilizers. They also typically cultivated bananas and fruit trees as shade for the coffee trees, which provided additional income and food security.

However, in the 1970s and 1980s, during the Green Revolution, the US Agency for International Development and other groups gave eighty million dollars to plantations in Latin America for advancements to go along with the general shift to technified agriculture. These plantations replaced their shade grown techniques with sun cultivation techniques to increase yields, which in turn destroyed forests and biodiversity.

Sun cultivation involves cutting down trees, and high inputs of chemical fertilizers and pesticides. Environmental problems, such as deforestation, pesticide pollution, habitat destruction, soil and water degradation, are the effects of most modern coffee farms, and the biodiversity on the coffee farm and in the surrounding areas suffer. Of the 50 countries with the highest deforestation rates from 1990 to 1995, 37 were coffee producers.

As a result, there has been a return to both traditional and new methods of growing shade-tolerant varieties. Shade-grown coffee can often earn a premium as a more environmentally sustainable alternative to mainstream sun-grown coffee.

== COVID-19 impact ==
The COVID-19 pandemic has produced both supply and demand effects on the coffee industry.

The effects on the industry caused by the pandemic will take some time to materialize, as there is a lag between the cause of the impact and its effects being measurable.

Causes of these effects can include direct impacts of employees missing work due to illness and indirect, as the result of measures taken to reduce the spread of the virus. For example, social distancing and work-from-home policies can have an impact on the effectiveness and productivity of individuals, groups, firms, etc.

=== Supply effects ===
COVID-19 has had a direct effect on export infrastructure such as warehouses and ports. These impacts include disruptions in supply chains, delays in shipments, and an increase in transaction costs. Delays and disruptions are caused by changes to processes aimed at reducing the spread of the virus. For a warehouse, these changes can include reduced staff onsite, increased social distancing meaning fewer employees performing the same task in the same area, etc. For a transportation division, these changes can include increased time spent at border for COVID-related inspections and checks, reduced drivers as a result of sickness, etc.

Global coffee exports for March 2020 were 3.7% lower than for March 2021, which is neither extreme nor solely attributed to COVID-19.

=== Demand effects ===
Coffee prices initially increased in the early weeks of the pandemic, likely as a result of widespread switching to at-home consumption from out-of-home consumption. However, because demand for coffee tends to remain relatively inelastic (meaning changes in price have little effect on demand) there has so far been little change recorded in the demand for coffee.

== See also ==
- Black Gold
