= Coffee production in Bolivia =

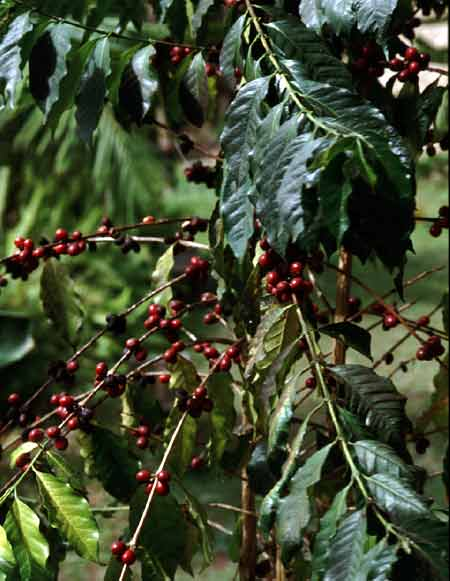
Coffee plant in Yungas, Bolivia.

Coffee production in Bolivia has had a long history in the country. Coffee is grown in regions of 800–2,300 metres (2,600–7,500 ft) above the sea level.

== History ==
19th century

Bolivia did not export as much coffee as the neighboring countries. The best coffee produced Yungas, which rivals Cafe mocha. The departments of La Paz, Cochabamba, Santa Cruz, and El Beni are the principal areas which produced coffee; the most notable areas were the districts of Yungas, Caupalicam, Espiritu Santo, and Valle Grande. There was a time in which the Yungas coffee had a great demand, especially so in Europe. This Asiatic plant is so well acclimatized in Yungas that it grows spontaneously, for each grain which falls on the ground becomes a tree. In 1885, the production of coffee was 2,400,000 pounds a year. By 1900, at La Paz, a machine was installed to roast and grind coffee, selling it in home-made tins.

Early 20th century

Production in 1908 was 1,500,000 pounds. About 150,000 pounds were exported annually; most of it is consigned to Chile.

== See also ==
- List of countries by coffee production
