= International Coffee Agreement =

1962 international commodity agreement

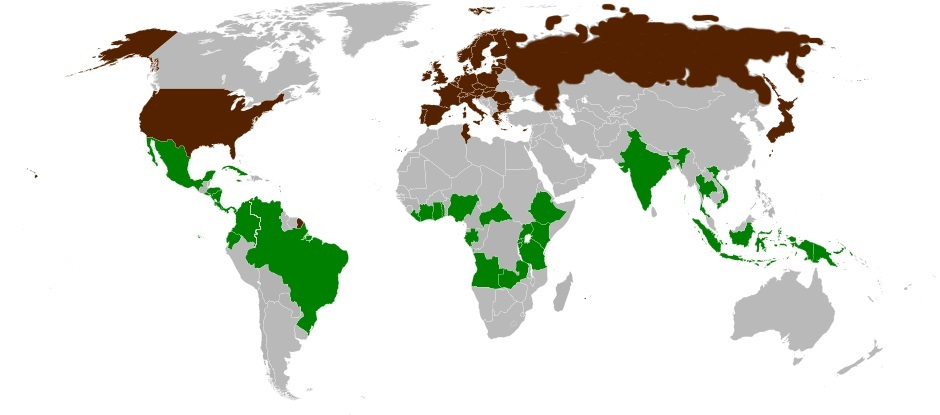
Map of members of the International Coffee Organization

The International Coffee Agreement (ICA) is an international commodity agreement between coffee producing countries and consuming countries. First signed in 1962, it was originally aimed at maintaining exporting countries' quotas and keeping coffee prices high and stable in the market, mainly using export quotas to steer the price. The International Coffee Organization, the controlling body of the agreement, represents all major coffee producing countries and most consuming countries.

The current 2022 agreement has 42 exporting members and 7 importing (the European Union represents all its member states as one member).

== History ==
The original agreement was signed in 1962 for a five-year period, and since then there have been seven subsequent agreements, ratified in 1968, 1976, 1983, 1994, 2001, 2007 and 2022.

=== Background ===
The precursor to the ICA was the Inter-American Coffee Agreement (IACA) established during the Second World War. The war had created the conditions for a Latin American coffee agreement: European markets were closed off, the price of coffee was in decline and the United States feared that the declining price could drive Latin American countries—especially Brazil—towards Nazi or Communist sympathies.

In 1940, the United States agreed to restrict its imports to a quota of 15.9 million bags, and other Latin American countries agreed to restrict their production. The agreement had an immediate effect, the price almost doubled by the end of 1941. After the end of the war in 1945 the price of coffee rose continuously until 1955–57 when a degree of equilibrium was reached.

Producers sought ways to maintain the price, this led to the first International Coffee Agreement. A target price was set, and export quotas allocated to each producer. When the indicator price set by the International Coffee Organization (ICO) fell below the target price, quotas were decreased; if it rose above it, quotas were increased. Although the system had its problems, it was successful in raising and stabilizing the price.

The International Coffee Organization was established in 1963 to administer the clauses of the agreement and supervise the mechanisms in place. Until 1986 the Coffee Council, the decision-making body of ICO, approved export quotas.

=== Breakdown of the 1989 agreement ===
In 1989, ICO failed to reach an agreement on new export quotas, causing the 1983 ICA to break down. The disagreement was triggered by consumers' change in taste towards milder and higher quality coffee. With the retained quotas from the 1983 agreement, the change increased the value of milder coffee at the expense of more traditional varieties such as robusta. Brazil in particular – the world's most powerful coffee producer – refused to reduce its quotas believing it would lower their market share. The consumers, led by the United States, demanded higher quality coffee and the end of selling coffee to non-members at reduced rates.

The US criticized Brazil for not being willing to accept a reduction of the country's quotas despite falling share of the world market since 1980. Jorio Dauster, head of the state-controlled Brazilian Coffee Institute, described Brazil as an "extremely efficient producer" and believed it could survive without help from ICO.

The 1983 ICA was set to expire on 1 October 1989, but realizing that it would be impossible to enter into a new agreement before the termination date, the Coffee Council (ICO's highest body) effectively decided to suspend the export quotas on 4 July 1989. Without an extended agreement producing countries lost most of their influence on the international market. ICO's average indicator price for the last five years previous the end of the regime fell from US$1.34 per pound, to US$0.77 per pound for the first five years after.

According to Yves Engler's Canada in Africa, "no longer worried about the prospect of poor coffee producers turning towards the Soviet Union, the US withdrew its support from the International Coffee Agreement in 1989."

=== United States withdrawal ===
The United States exited the International Coffee Agreement after a 90-day notification period ending 27 June 2018.

== Members ==
The current 2007 ICA entered into force on 2 February 2011 when it was approved by two-thirds of the exporting and importing signatory governments. As of 2013, it has 51 members, of which 44 are exporting members, and 7 importing (the European Union represents all its 28 member states). According to ICO, its members represent 98% of all coffee production and 67% of the consumption.

Exporting members (42)

- Angola
- Benin
- Bolivia (Note: Provisional application)
- Brazil
- Burundi
- Cameroon
- Central African Republic
- Colombia
- Costa Rica
- Ivory Coast
- Cuba
- Ecuador
- El Salvador
- Ethiopia
- Gabon
- Ghana
- Guatemala
- Guinea
- Haiti
- Honduras
- India
- Indonesia
- Jamaica
- Kenya
- Liberia
- Malawi
- Mexico
- Nicaragua
- Panama
- Papua New Guinea
- Paraguay
- Philippines
- Rwanda
- Sierra Leone
- Tanzania
- Thailand
- East Timor
- Togo
- Uganda
- Vietnam
- Yemen
- Zambia
- Zimbabwe

Importing members (7)

- Japan
- Norway
- Russian Federation
- Switzerland
- Tunisia
- United Kingdom
- European Union:
  - Austria
  - Belgium
  - Bulgaria
  - Croatia
  - Cyprus
  - Czech Republic
  - Denmark
  - Estonia
  - Finland
  - France
  - Germany
  - Greece
- European Union (continued):
  - Hungary
  - Ireland
  - Italy
  - Latvia
  - Lithuania
  - Luxembourg
  - Malta
  - Netherlands
  - Poland
  - Portugal
  - Romania
  - Slovakia
  - Slovenia
  - Spain
  - Sweden
