= Coffee production in Guatemala =

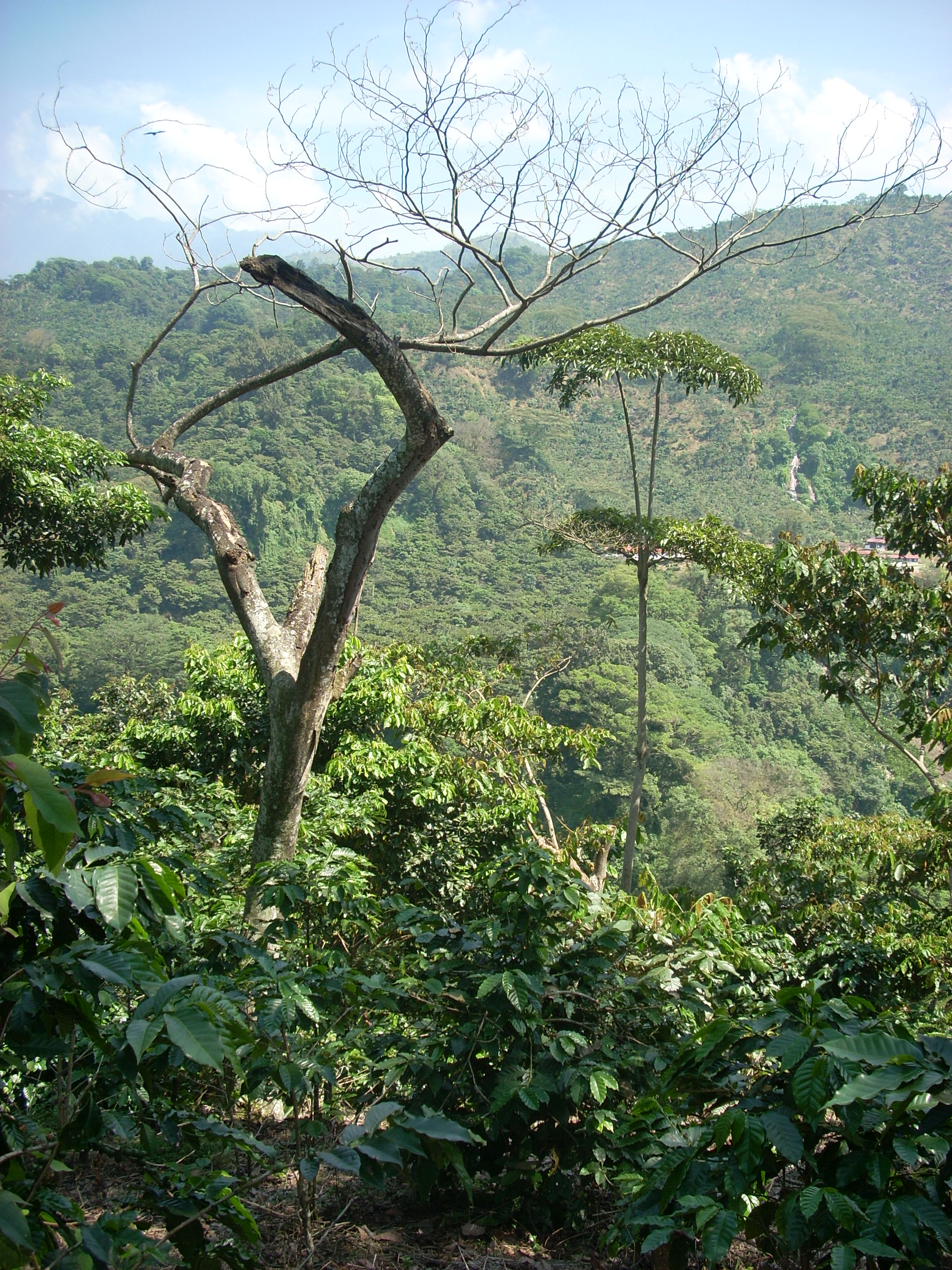
The Las Merceditas coffee plantation, San Rafael Pie de la Cuesta, Guatemala.

Coffee production began to develop in Guatemala in the 1850s. Coffee is an important element of Guatemala's economy.

Guatemala was Central America's top producer of coffee for most of the 20th and the beginning of the 21st century, until being overtaken by Honduras in 2011. Illegal exports to Honduras and Mexico are not reflected in official statistics.

== Geography ==
The most suitable temperature for the healthy growth and abundant production of coffee in Guatemala is that of 16 to 32 °C (60 to 90 °F). In lands situated at an altitude of 500–700 metres (1,600–2,300 ft) above sea level, young plants must be shaded.

For the most part, the coffee plantations are situated at an altitude varying from 500 metres (1,600 ft) to 1,500 metres (4,900 ft) above sea level. At elevations greater than 1,500 metres (4,900 ft), the plantations must be sheltered from the cold north winds.

== History ==
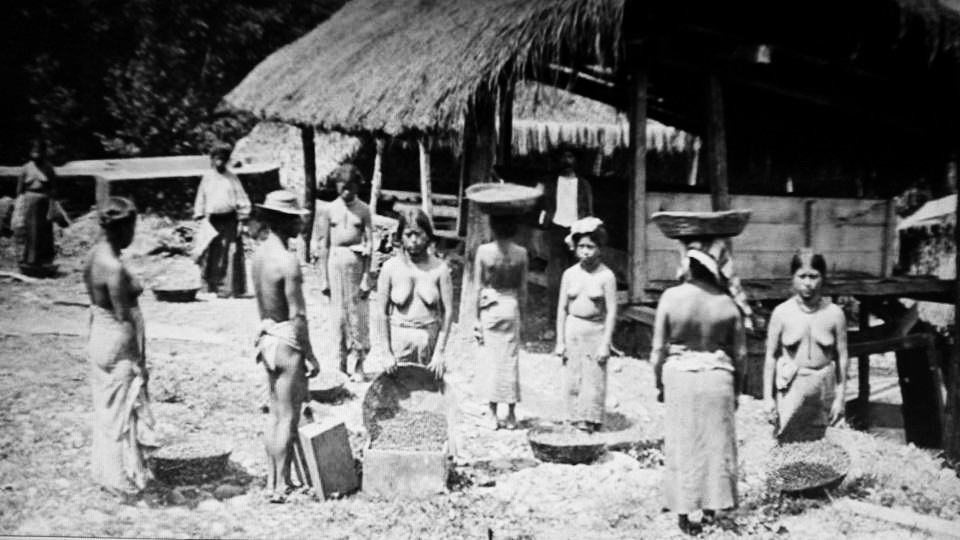
Indigenous workers on a coffee plantation, 1875.

=== Guatemala Commodity Exports Prior to Coffee Domination ===
The coffee industry began to develop in Guatemala in the 1850s and 1860s, initially mixing its cultivation with cochineal, though the latter export had held monopoly over Guatemala's raw export economy since the Spanish colonial era. In 1850, for example, 93% of the colony's exports were in cochineal, the natural red dye created from the dried and crushed bugs of the coccidae family of scale insects. Natural indigo was another prominent export encouraged by the Spanish colonial government, though its output declined by the end of the 18th century. Small coffee plantations flourished in Amatitlán and Antigua areas in the southwest.

=== The Expansion of Coffee Production Under President Barrios' Liberal Regime (1871) ===
Guatemala's entrance into the coffee export market was catalyzed by poor cochineal harvests in the mid 19th century, the invention of aniline dyes that reduced demand for natural dyes, and neighboring Costa Rica's emerging coffee export success. Cochineal harvests were also considered to be "precarious", highly localized, and burdened by inefficient transportation from the limited region in which it could be produced. By comparison, coffee could be cultivated in greater portions of the countryside, attracted high market prices, was less perishable, and cheaper to transport across long distances. For a newly independent state, integration of rural production into the international market promised a wider revenue base for the government.

Despite suitable climate for cultivation, initial growth of coffee production was hindered by lack of knowledge and technology, communication, cheap labor, and clear land title. The state inherited a land tenure scheme from Spanish colonization that discouraged communities from selling land to those who were not indigenous, as the government drew a substantial amount of its revenue from Indian tribute generated on indigenous lands. In fact, and until 1877, it was only with state permission that community lands could be sold to outsiders. Despite state control over the transfer of land title, land relations during the colonial period could be characterized by an inability of political and commercial elites to gain power in the countryside as landowners. In the period immediately following independence in 1821, the newly empowered liberal regime passed a slew of land laws that would attempt to transform customary land tenure under which village access to and ownership over community and ancestral lands for subsistence and grazing was foundational. These liberal reforms were intended to modernize the country and align it with English liberalism, and included the conversion of ejidos into private, family farms, the substitution of a land tax for a tithe to stimulate agricultural production, and the auctioning of church land. However, these reforms were functionally useless so long as elites did not have access to the rural countryside and were further complicated by civil wars, banditry, and disease from the 1820s to 1840s. The Conservative regime that followed Rafael Carrera’s 1839 peasant revolt did little to implement the Liberals’ land tenure regime, and this period was marked by a relative increase in political disinterest in the rural countryside. For a generation, indigenous communities in the countryside were abandoned by church and central government institutions, the former having been weakened by declining revenues and an adversarial relationship with the state. As such, these village communities were left free to develop “traditional” society and a culture of “closed corporate peasant community”. Many early coffee planters had to rely on personal loans from family members and loans backed by their urban properties to finance their coffee estates (fincas).

McCreery calls the rise of coffee production and export in the latter half of the 19th century as “the most fundamental change” in Guatemala’s institutions since the Spanish conquest. This period of unprecedented change was ushered in by the Liberal Revolution of 1871 and the coinciding seizure of power by General Justo Rufino Barrios, himself a coffee planter. Prior to the Liberal Revolution, coffee accounted for half of Guatemala’s exports, however, cultivable ejido land on the southern coast and the highlands represented thousands of acres laying unproductive and for integration into the coffee export economy. Barrios’ regime quickly began to increase coffee producers’ access to the rural countryside by encouraging private investors to expand and modernize the railroads, roads, telegraphs, and other infrastructure. The founding of the state’s first agricultural bank and the expansion of merchant banking encouraged the flow of capital into agricultural productivity. Cheap land was secured, for example, by the passage of an 1873 provision that declared certain coastal lands baldíos (uncultivated or fallow) and to be sold at low, fixed prices despite several communities laying claim to the lands. Public lands were opened to extractive activities like rubber, chicle, and lumber harvesting.

Cheap land was further secured by the “revolutionary” issuance of Decree 170 in 1877, ending censo enfiteusis, a land contract that allows an owner to confer usufruct rights to an individual in exchange for an annual payment equal to some percentage of the land’s value. Tenants who had previously had user rights over the land, but not official title, were given a short time period to purchase it. What resulted in the following decades was mass dispossession of communal, indigenous lands for coffee production.

It is important note, however, that the Liberal Regime did not abolish community property and allowed it to continue de facto and de jure as capitalist production of food could not compete with peasant production in domestic markets. Ejidos were also where coffee producers could secure indigenous community members as a reliable, and reproducing, supply of cheap, seasonal labor. Due to coffee’s labor-intensive, six-year maturation period before producing fruit, cheap labor was critical to expanding production, and the expansion of coffee plantations was limited largely due to a scarcity of labor. This cheap input was further secured by the issuance of Decree 177, also in 1877, that legalized debt peonage and reinstated mandamientos, a labor draft system in which governors were compelled to supply laborers to export producers.

The spatial expansion of coffee occurred incrementally and persistence of a community on their land depended on several factors including its location, population, external demands on the community for land and labor, and how quickly community leaders could understand and leverage new land tenure laws. This heterogeneity made it extremely difficult for indigenous communities to violently mobilize against coffee expansion. Furthermore, the state's expansion of telegraph networks into the interior, the professionalization of the military, and surveillance by local military chiefs and state political agents ensured that communities' control of the countryside in which the state could not penetrate during the 1830s and 1840s would not be replicated. However, indigenous populations did attempt to escape coffee labor demands by fleeing to other areas domestically, fleeing to neighboring countries of Belize and Mexico, or fleeing into the wilderness.

Coffee exports made up just 1% of exports in 1860. By 1880, and as a consequence of Barrios’ liberal reforms, coffee accounted for 92% of Guatemala’s export value, completely overshadowing any other export commodity. For example, in 1887 coffee production was over 22,000,000 kg (48,500,000 lb) and by 1891, it was over 24,000,000 kg (52,000,000 lb). From 1879 to 1883, Guatemala exported 133,027,289 kg (293,274,971 lb) pounds of coffee. The domination of coffee as an export commodity also provided a generous increase to state budgets—the Guatemalan government was able to nearly triple its operating budget and nearly quintuple its war budget between 1870 and 1890.

The legacy of land privatization and consolidation continues into the modern day—65% of arable land was owned by 2% of the population by the end of the 20th century.

By 1902 the most important coffee plantations were found on the southern coast, and production was increasingly bolstered by foreign companies who possessed the financial power to buy plantations and provide investment. Many acres of land were suitable for this cultivation, and the varieties that were produced in the temperate regions were superior. Coffee was grown around Guatemala City, Chimaltenango, and Verapaz. The majority of the plantations were located in the departments of Guatemala, Amatitlan, Sacatepequez, Solola, Retalhuleu, Quezaltenango, San Marcos, and Alta Verapaz.

== Anacafé ==
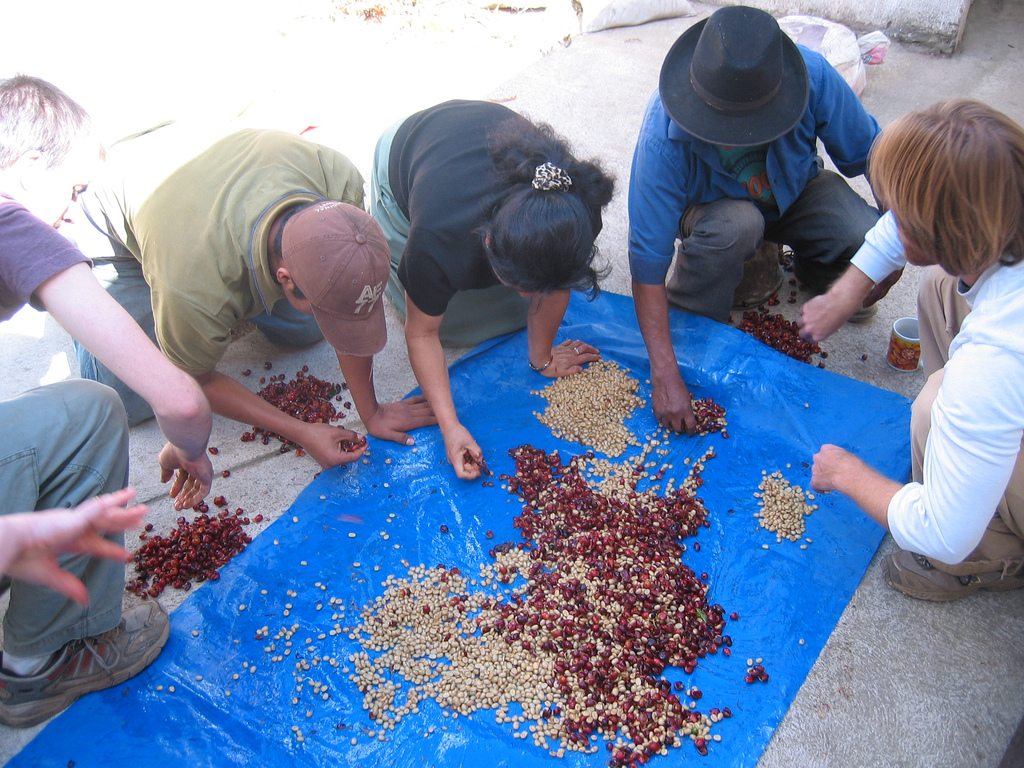
Coffee beans being sorted, Guatemala.

Anacafé (Asociación Nacional del Café) was established in 1960 as a national coffee association, representing all coffee producers in Guatemala. It was initiated by the precursors to the International Coffee Organization, as a way of centralizing statistics of the nation's coffee production as it continued the work of La Oficina Central del Café, previously established and operated by the central government which in turn was established in 1928.

Anacafé has established a Guatemalan Coffees brand and defined eight coffee regions under the slogan "A Rainbow of Choices". The regions are: Acatenango Valley, Antigua Coffee, Traditional Atitlan, Rainforest Coban, Fraijanes Plateau, Highland Huehue, New Oriente, and Volcanic San Marcos.

Anacafé has built the Analab coffee laboratories, established a program for children called Funcafé, and publishes El Cafetal, a coffee magazine. Anacafé represents Guatemala in the International Coffee Organization's meetings and receives income only from service charges on exported coffee items.

== Labor issues ==
Research has shown that some of Guatemala's coffee producers used child labor in 2013, according to the U.S. Department of Labor.

== See also ==
- List of countries by coffee production
