= Coffee production in the Philippines =

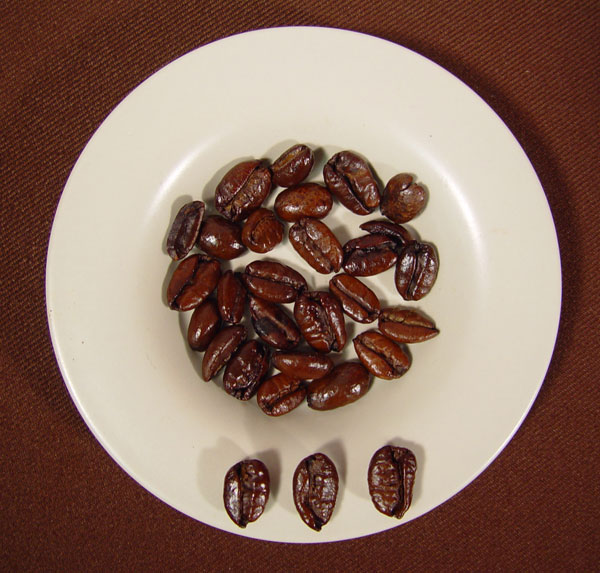
Liberica coffee beans from Mindoro.

Coffee is an important agricultural product in the Philippines, and is one of the Philippines' most important export products aside from being in high demand in the country's local consumer market.

The Philippines is one of the few countries that produce the four main viable coffee varieties; Arabica, Liberica (Barako), Excelsa and Robusta. 90 percent of coffee produced in the country is Robusta. There have been efforts to revitalize the coffee industry.

As of 2014, the Philippines produces 25,000 metric tons of coffee and is ranked 110th in terms of output. However local demand for coffee is high with 100,000 metric tons of coffee consumed in the country per year.

Coffee was said to have been introduced in the Philippines around 1696 when the Dutch introduced coffee in the islands. It was once a major industry in the Philippines, which by the 1800s was the fourth largest coffee producing nation.

However, Islamic culture has been pervaded by coffee drinkers from the 1500s. And with the close ties of the Philippines to the Islamic World since the 12th century, it would not be impossible to speculate that coffee has been in the Philippines before the Dutch "introduced" it.

== History ==
=== Early years ===
Arabica coffee variety was introduced in West Java in 1690. Muslim pilgrims had already smuggled Yemeni seed to west India, the real source of Dutch seedlings, and probably introduced it to Sumatra. West Sumatran coffee was sold to British interlopers and American missionaries spread coffee further, probably to the Philippines in the eighteenth century. Southeast Asian consumption of coffee grew and was closely associated culturally with Islam.

Coffee was introduced in the Philippines as early as 1730, when a Franciscan friar planted the first coffee tree in Lipa, Batangas. Coffee introduced from the Philippines came from Mexico. Coffee production was later promoted by Augustinian friars Elias Nebreda and Benito Varas in other parts of Batangas such as Ibaan, Lemery, San Jose, Taal, and Tanauan. Coffee plantations became part of the foundation of Batangas' economy and Lipa was later labeled as the coffee capital of the Philippines.

=== Growth in the 19th century ===
Following the aftermath of the American Civil War, in the 1865, there was a sudden increase of demand for Philippine coffee in the United States since it became cheaper importing coffee from the Philippines than importing coffee from Brazil. Barako from Batangas was shipped from Manila to San Francisco. Half of the Philippines' coffee export in that year were shipped to San Francisco. Coffee also began to be exported to Europe following the opening of the Suez Canal in 1869. In 1876, coffee was introduced in the town of Amadeo in neighboring Cavite and the province began producing coffee. However, Lipa remained as the main producer of coffee in the Philippines and Batangas barako cost five times as much as Java beans. In 1880, the Philippines was the fourth largest exporter of coffee beans. Coffee production in competitor regions of Brazil, Africa and Java declined when coffee rust plagued the regions and from 1887 to 1889, the Philippines was the only source of coffee in the world.

=== Decline in the 1880s-1890s ===
In 1889, coffee production in the country saw a great decline following the introduction of coffee rust in the country and increased incidence of insect infestation. These elements virtually destroyed all coffee trees in Batangas. By 1891, coffee production in the country was reduced to 1/6 of its total production two years earlier. By this period, Brazil has regained its position as a major coffee producer. Surviving coffee seedlings were transferred to Cavite as many farmers in Batangas shifted to growing other crops.

=== Post-World War II ===
During the 1950s, the Philippine government, with assistance from Americans, introduced a variety of coffee to the country which is more resistant. Instant coffee began to be produced in commercial quantities which resulted in increased demand for coffee. Many farmers began shifting back to growing coffee in the 1960s. Importation of coffee was momentarily stopped due to a surplus in the world market due to sudden proliferation of coffee farms. In 1980, the Philippines became a member of the International Coffee Organization (ICO).

=== 21st century ===
The bean belt and the top 20 coffee producing countries in 2011 according to FAOSTAT which includes the Philippines.

Demand for coffee experienced growth. In 2002, the yearly coffee consumption of the Philippines was 75,000 metric tons. This figure grew to 170,000 metric tons annually by 2018. As of the same year, the Philippines began to import coffee due to low coffee production at only 35,000 metric tons annually. It imports about 75,000-100,000 metric tons of dried coffee beans amounting ₱7 billion−10 billion from Vietnam and Indonesia according to the Department of Agriculture (DA).

By 2016, according to PhilMech, an agency under DA, Mindanao is the leader of local production of dried coffee beans. Sultan Kudarat is the province that produces the most coffee in the island. Coffee production in traditional cultivation areas such as the Cordillera and Calabarzon experienced a decline due to strong typhoons which battered the region in the same year.

While 2020 brought further challenges – including the COVID-19 pandemic and the Taal Volcano eruption – it could also mark the beginning of a new era for Philippine specialty coffee. For the first time in history, a locally produced coffee won the 2020 Philippine National Barista Championship (PNBC).

The Duterte administration signed a “Philippine Coffee Industry Roadmap 2017-2022” with the purpose of boosting the country's annual domestic coffee output from 37,000 metric tons (MT) a year to 214,626 MT by 2022. According to the roadmap, this will bring the country's coffee self-sufficiency level to 161% from the current 41.6%. Sitios Balutakay and Pluto, Barangay Managa, Bansalan strategically located at Mount Apo's foothills is one of the best sources of Arabica coffee (Citrus Sparkle) in Southeast Asia. Recognized by the Filipino Coffee Institute, its “Winners Circle” farmers, members of Balutakay Farmers Cooperative (Bacofa) won several coffee competitions, including the Southeast Asia Green Coffee Competition in Thailand.

== Climate change ==
Agriculture in the Philippines is highly susceptible to the effects of global climate change. Extreme weather events have destroyed coffee plantations in the Philippines and are having long-term effects on production. Typhoon Ompong in 2018 damaged more than 20,000 coffee trees along the Cordillera Mountain Range.

== See also ==
- List of countries by coffee production
