= Coffee production in Democratic Republic of the Congo =

Coffee as an agricultural commodity in Democratic Republic of the Congo

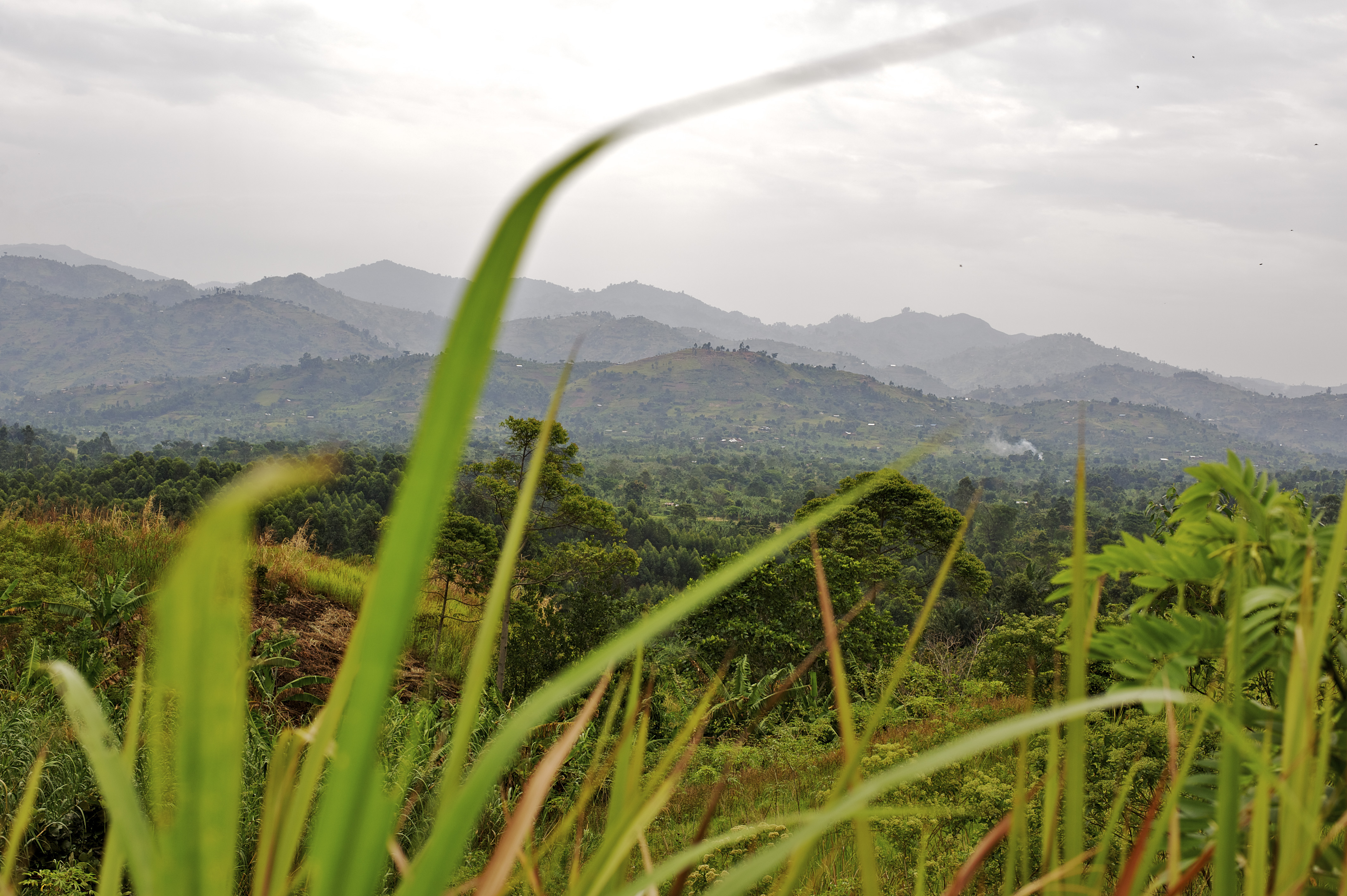
DRC coffee plantation

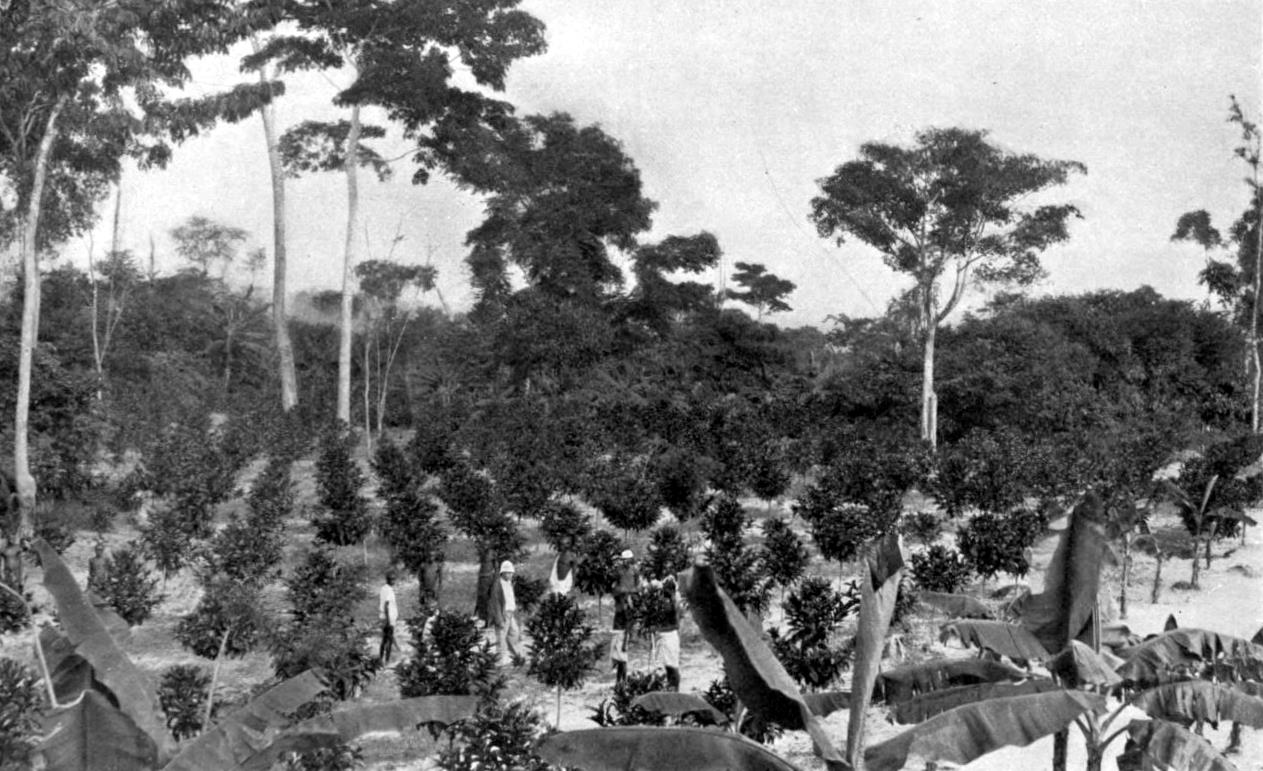
Coffee plantation at Yalicombe, Oriental Province, before 1905

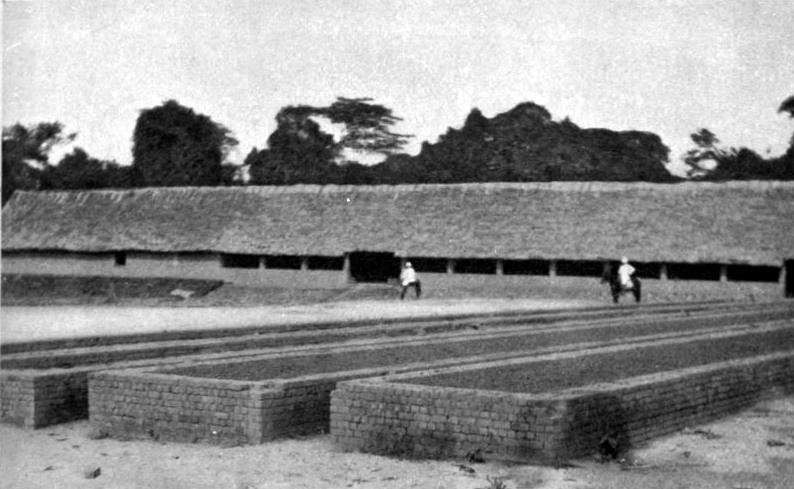
Coffee drying grounds, Coquilhatville, before 1905

Coffee production in Democratic Republic of the Congo (DRC) is centered in the Lake Kivu provinces. There are about 11,000 coffee farmers in the country who produce two main species of coffee, Robusta and Arabica.

== Farmers and co-ops ==
There were more than 11,000 coffee farmers in the DRC in 2013. Co-operative associations, such as Furaha, Muungano, and Sopacdi are valuable partners to the coffee farmers in sales and distribution.

== Species ==
Many varieties of coffee are grown in the DRC but the two major species are Robusta, which is grown mainly in the northeast of the country such as in Isiro, and in the low lands of Ubangi, Uele, Kivu, Kasai, and Bas-Congo; and the lighter Arabica varieties which is grown at higher elevations in Kivu and Ituri. Arabica accounts for one fifth of the total production of coffee.

== Production ==
By 1989, coffee exports were at a high of 121,235 metric tons (119,320 long tons), but they declined sharply in the 1994–2003 period, possibly due to the civil wars of 1997 and 1998. Coffee wilt disease also affected growth in some areas. After the peace agreement was signed in December 2002, following the end of the civil war, production of coffee rose to 40,642 metric tons (40,000 long tons) in 2003 from a figure of 32,514 metric tons (32,000 long tons) in 2002. In 2006, coffee production, in terms of 60 kilograms (130 lb) bags, was 100,000 bags of Arabica and 470,000 bags of Robusta. Total exports were 400,000 bags of 60 kilograms (130 lb), but by 2010 coffee production was still 6,096 metric tons (6,000 long tons) less than 10% of what it had been 20 years earlier in 1989 [121,235 metric tons (119,320 long tons)].

In 2012, the government launched a programme for the recovery of the coffee sector titled Strategy Document for the Recovery of the Coffee Sector 2011–2015 and made a budgetary provision US$100 million for the purpose. It was estimated that the recovery plan would result in an increase in production to 121,926 metric tons (120,000 long tons) by 2015. The regions where recovery of coffee growth has been planned are eight districts of South Kivu province, the Robusta variety of coffee in the Orientale province, and about 700 hectares (1,700 acres) of Arabica coffee in Bandundu province.

== See also ==
- List of countries by coffee production

== Bibliography ==
- Kisangani, Emizet Francois; Bobb, Scott F. (1 October 2009). Historical Dictionary of the Democratic Republic of the Congo. Scarecrow Press. ISBN 978-0-8108-6325-5.
