= San Rafael Pie de la Cuesta =

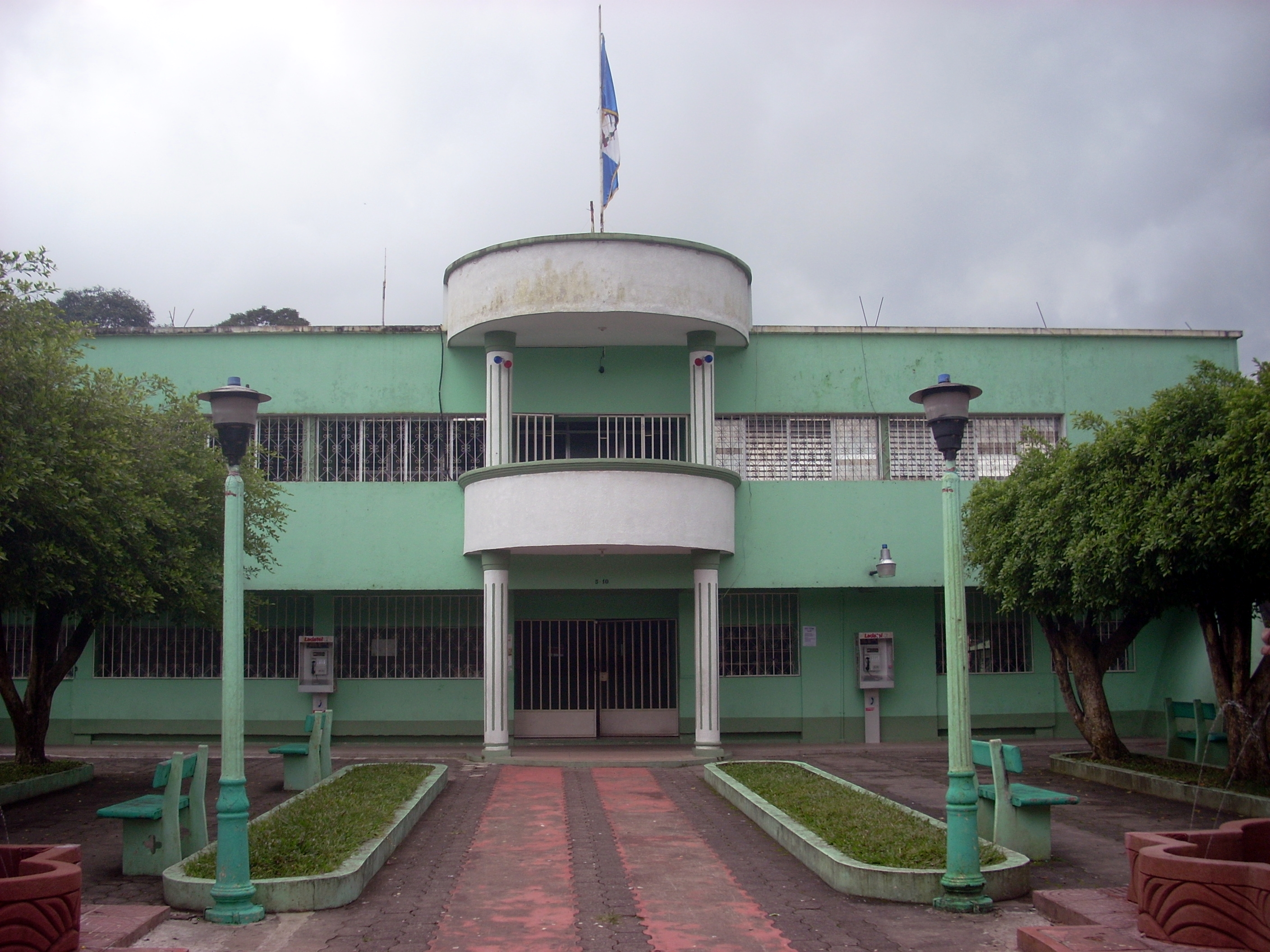
- Municipal offices of San Rafael Pie de la Cuesta

- Flag

- Location in Guatemala
- Coordinates: 14°56′00″N 91°55′00″W
- Country: Guatemala
- Department: San Marcos Department

Government
  - Mayor: Carlos Mazariegos (LIDER)

Population (2021)
  - Total: 18,352

San Rafael Pie de la Cuesta (Spanish pronunciation: [san rafaˈel pje ðe la ˈkwesta]) is a municipality in the San Marcos department of Guatemala.

A small town of 4,320 residents. Red tiled roofs and abundant flowering trees are found there. It is located 13 km southwest of San Marcos. The English translation of the town's name is "At the foot of the steep slope." That is because the town is found along a winding, steep road from San Rafael which rises from 900 meters to 2500 meters in only 15 km. The town is in the northern department of San Marcos, Guatemala, bordering Mexico. San Rafael Pie de la Cuesta is warmer than the rest of the department. As its name implies, San Rafael Pie de la Cuesta lies at the base of the Sierra Madre mountain range. There are many coffee plantations in the area.

== Climate ==
San Rafael Pie de la Cuesta has a tropical climate (Köppen: Am).

Climate data for San Rafael Pie de la Cuesta
Month	Jan	Feb	Mar	Apr	May	Jun	Jul	Aug	Sep	Oct	Nov	Dec	Year
Mean daily maximum °C (°F)	28.5 (83.3)	28.8 (83.8)	30.0 (86.0)	30.1 (86.2)	29.7 (85.5)	28.5 (83.3)	29.1 (84.4)	29.2 (84.6)	28.3 (82.9)	28.2 (82.8)	28.4 (83.1)	28.4 (83.1)	28.9 (84.1)
Daily mean °C (°F)	22.4 (72.3)	22.6 (72.7)	23.6 (74.5)	24.0 (75.2)	23.9 (75.0)	23.2 (73.8)	23.4 (74.1)	23.5 (74.3)	23.1 (73.6)	22.9 (73.2)	22.9 (73.2)	22.5 (72.5)	23.2 (73.7)
Mean daily minimum °C (°F)	16.4 (61.5)	16.5 (61.7)	17.2 (63.0)	18.0 (64.4)	18.2 (64.8)	17.9 (64.2)	17.7 (63.9)	17.8 (64.0)	17.9 (64.2)	17.7 (63.9)	17.4 (63.3)	16.7 (62.1)	17.5 (63.4)
Average precipitation mm (inches)	50 (2.0)	56 (2.2)	122 (4.8)	256 (10.1)	516 (20.3)	674 (26.5)	493 (19.4)	505 (19.9)	691 (27.2)	571 (22.5)	184 (7.2)	78 (3.1)	4,196 (165.2)
Source: Climate-Data.org

== Bird sanctuary ==
The municipality oversees a bird reserve called El Refugio del Quetzal. It is part of the Tacan-Tajumulco Important Bird Area and designated by BirdLife International.

== Geographic location ==
Located 27 km west of San Marcos and is surrounded by San Marcos Department municipalities.
