= Coffee production in the Dominican Republic =

Coffee production in the Dominican Republic is based mainly in the mountain regions of the country, in the highlands which form at least one-half of the area of Hispaniola. Introduced to the country in 1715, the Dominican Republic bean is larger and thicker than Martinique's. The major coffee variety grown in the country is Arabica (known internationally as “mild”). Robusta is also grown but only in about 1.3% of the land area; it is consumed locally.

== History ==
Coffee was first introduced in the Dominican Republic in 1715 and has been the principal crop of the small scale farmers. Coffee began to be exported circa 1872. In the early 20th century, the crop was cultivated in all the Cibao, principally in the district of Puerto Plata. The exportation of coffee from the Dominican Republic in 1900 amounted to 3,951,539 pounds (1,792,388 kg). Important coffee areas in 1918 were in Moca, Santiago and Baní, with approximately 66% of the crop exported from Puerto Plata.

The area under coffee plantation was 120,000 hectares (300,000 acres) (about 3% of land under farming), but since 1981 the area cropped has substantially declined, but the production level has remained generally the same due to the adoption of modern technological inputs. There are five major coffee producing regions, four of them being in the hilly region – the Central Mountain Region, the Northern Mountain Region, the Neyba Mountain Range, and the Bahoruco Mountain Range. There were 40,000 to 50,000 farmers operating in this sector.

== Production ==
In 2013, according to FAO statistics, coffee production was 10,100 short tons (9,200 t), which was about 0.1 percent of world production. It was grown in an area of 22,400 hectares (55,000 acres) with a yield of 451 kilograms (994 lb) per ha.

== See also ==
- Economy of the Dominican Republic
- List of countries by coffee production
