= Geisha (coffee) =

Coffee variety

Coffee Variety Information
- Stature: Tall
- Leaf Tip Color: Green or Bronze
- Bean Size: Average
- Quality Potential: Exceptional
- Yield Potential: Low
- Coffee Leaf Rust: Intermediate resistance
- Coffee Berry Disease (CBD): Susceptible
- Nematodes: Susceptible

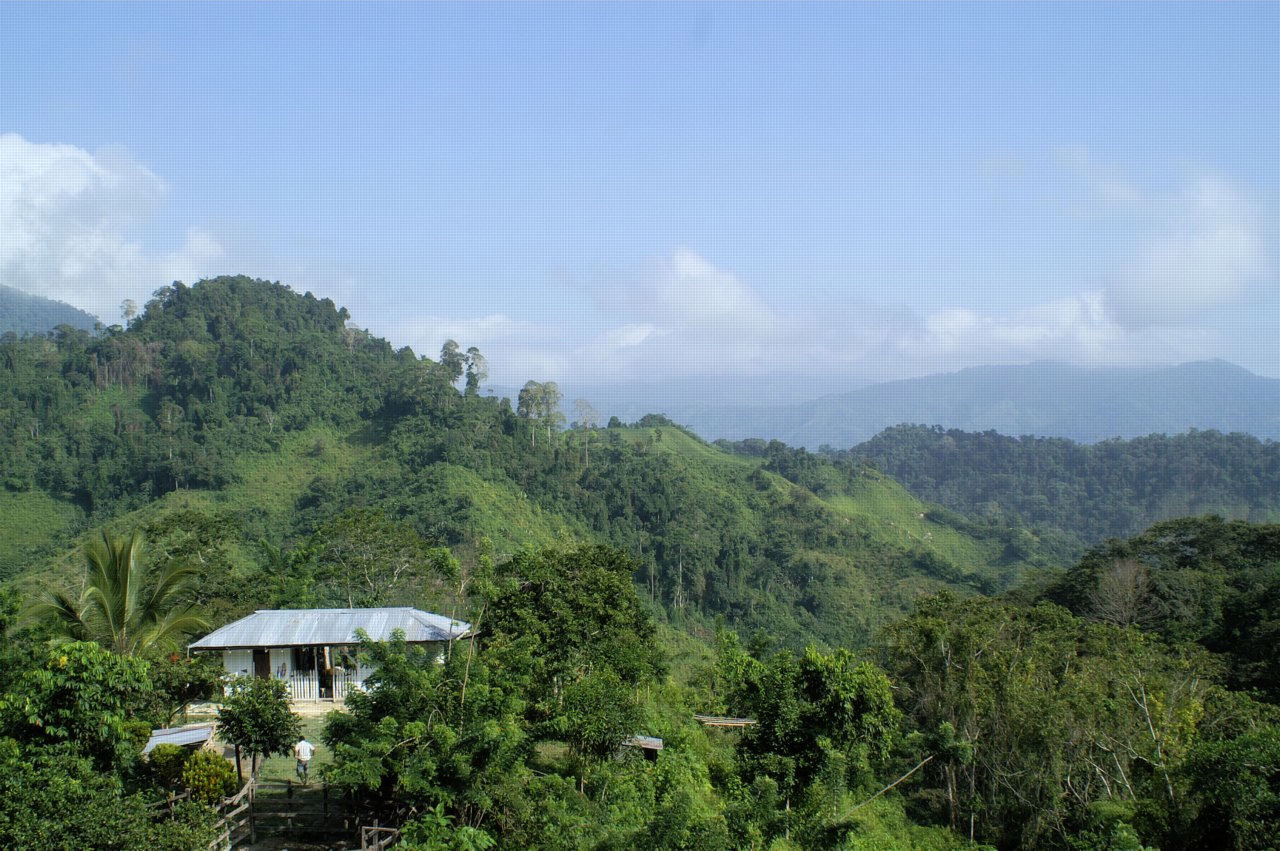
An overview look at a coffee farm

Gesha coffee, sometimes referred to as Geisha coffee, is a variety of coffee tree that originated in the Gori Gesha forest, Ethiopia, though it is now grown in several other nations in Africa, Asia, and the Americas. It is widely known for its unique flavor profile of floral and sweet notes, its high selling price, and its exclusivity as its demand has increased over the years.

While there are many varieties labeled gesha (or geisha), the Panamanian Geisha has a distinct and verifiable genetic fingerprint. Outside Panama, Geisha is also widely cultivated in Malawi.

After its discovery in Ethiopia, it was sent to the Tengeru (now Lyamungu) Coffee Research Station in Tanzania. In 1953, plants successfully cultivated at Lyamungu as VC-496 were taken to Centro Agronómico Tropical de Investigación y Enseñanza (CATIE) in Costa Rica and recorded as accession T2722. From there, CATIE distributed it throughout Central America. In 2005, the Peterson family of Boquete, Panama, entered a Geisha coffee into the Best Of Panama competition. It won the competition and sold for a then-record price of US$770/kilogram (US$350/pound). In 2025, a lot of washed Geisha from Hacienda La Esmeralda established a new Best of Panama record of US$30,204/kilogram (US$13,700.3/pound).

== Origin and name disambiguation ==
The name "Gesha" comes from the transliteration of the Amharic name for the region, ጌሻ. (The local Kafa language in Gesha did not have a written form until the 1990s.) In most instances, Geisha/Gesha coffees from Ethiopia use the Gesha spelling while those from elsewhere use Geisha, based on how the cultivator was originally labeled, although some Latin American producers use Gesha to indicate a variety grown from original Ethiopian stock. The name "Geisha" has been applied to the coffee since it was first collected by British officials. A 1936 letter from the British Consulate in Ethiopia discussing a trip to the "Geisha coffee area," where samples were collected for further study. Despite the origin of the Geisha name being a misspelling or phonetic rendering for Gesha, the increasing awareness of the variety has raised concerns about improperly linking the coffee with Japanese geisha entertainers.

== History ==
Coffee production in Ethiopia dates back dozens of centuries; according to legend it has been harvested there since the 9th century. Ethiopia is the world's main storehouse of genetic diversity for Arabica coffee, and this diversity is manifest in the chemicals that produce flavour. Ethiopia has a complex climate and landscape, resulting in regional and local differences across the coffee growing landscape. The Geisha variety of Coffea arabica was identified in the 1930s, in the mountainous Gesha region of southwestern Ethiopia. After seeds were collected in 1936 by a British consul, the coffee was planted in Tanzania and Costa Rica. From there, cultivation spread to Panama in the 1960s, including the famed Boquete region that was suffering from the leaf rust fungus. This variety is resistant to this fungus but it has a small root system and is not very productive. There was no specialty coffee back in those days, so farmers switched back to other varieties.

== Production method ==
Geisha coffee begins with picking the ripest cherries. Producers prefer hand-picked cherries as it helps ensure only properly ripe coffee cherries are harvested. The riper the cherry means the resulting coffee will have a sweeter flavor profile. The cherries then go through quality inspection. Some producers have the technology to put their cherries into a machine which determines the quality of the cherries. Some smaller producers have workers sort through the picked cherries by hand. The cherries are processed either by means of wet or dry methods. Washed coffees are often described as 'cleaner' and more delicate in the cup (i.e., during drinking), lighter-bodied, and with a brighter, better-defined acidity and brighter fruit notes. Washed coffees are also described as more balanced (i.e., lacking particularly strong tasting notes or biases). Dry-processed (natural) coffees tend to be fuller-bodied, fruitier, sweeter and less acidic, although in some cases the acidity is more pronounced and easier to define.

After those methods are complete, the producers end with a Geisha coffee bean.

== Flavor ==
The flavor profile of Geisha coffee is one aspect that contributes to its popularity. Geisha is known for its sweet flavor and aroma of floral notes, jasmine, chocolate, honey, and even black tea. These sweet floral notes and complex flavor profiles are characteristics that Geisha coffee shares with many other African coffees. This flavor is also one of the contributing factors for Geisha's high price tag. Whilst it may be difficult to pinpoint a flavour profile to any specific coffee area, the differences between (and even identification of) many of the coffee areas can be made by experienced coffee cuppers. Gesha is the home of Gesha (Geisha) coffee, and this origin is now starting to produce its own washed, semi-washed, and dry-processed coffees. Gesha (Geisha) coffee grown within and outside Ethiopia is noted for its aroma and flavour, with notes of jasmine, black tea, and tropical fruit, and for sweetness. For these reasons, the Gesha (Geisha) coffee is sought-after and usually sells at a high price.

== Sales and auction prices ==
The Best of Panama Coffee Competition has high dollar coffee at auction. This is where Geisha made itself known as one of the world's highest costing coffees. In 2004, Hacienda La Esmeralda entered the coffee into the competition where it was purchased at auction for a record price of $21 per pound. Fifteen years later, at the 2019 Best of Panama Competition and Auction, another Geisha sold for $1,029 per pound (unroasted). Earning the nickname "Elida Natural Geisha 1029," this Geisha was produced on the Lamastus Family Estates. One hundred pounds of Geisha coffee sold for $100,000, ranking above the next closest coffee by $80,000.
