= List of countries by soybean production =

Soybean production

This is a list of countries by soybean production from 2016 to 2022, based on data from the Food and Agriculture Organization Corporate Statistical Database. The total world production for soybeans in 2022 was 348,856,427 metric tonnes, down 6.4% from 372,853,699 tonnes in 2021. Brazil was the largest producer, accounting for 35% of world production, followed by the United States at 33%.

== Production by country ==
Country	2022	2021	2020	2019	2018	2017	2016
Brazil	120,701,031	134,799,179	121,820,949	114,316,829	117,912,450	114,732,101	96,394,820
United States	116,377,000	121,527,780	114,748,940	96,667,090	120,514,490	120,064,970	116,931,500
Argentina	43,861,066	46,217,911	48,780,407	55,263,891	37,787,927	54,971,626	58,799,258
China	20,280,000	16,400,000	19,600,000	18,100,000	15,967,100	15,282,500	12,788,894
India	12,986,720	12,610,300	11,225,850	13,267,520	10,932,970	13,158,730	13,159,000
Canada	6,543,158	6,224,029	6,358,500	6,145,000	7,416,600	7,716,600	6,596,500
Russia	6,003,153	4,759,908	4,307,593	4,359,956	4,026,850	3,621,712	3,142,693
Paraguay	4,532,103	10,537,080	11,024,460	8,520,350	11,045,971	10,478,000	9,163,030
Bolivia	3,457,144	3,318,169	2,829,356	2,990,845	2,942,131	2,671,046	3,203,992
Ukraine	3,443,800	3,493,200	2,797,670	3,698,710	4,460,770	3,899,370	4,276,990
South Africa	1,148,300	1,897,000	1,245,500	1,170,345	1,540,000	1,316,000	742,000
Nigeria	1,060,000	1,166,050	1,262,280	800,000	660,000	993,955	936,887
Italy	943,400	923,470	1,005,630	1,042,830	1,186,350	1,019,781	1,081,340
Uruguay	647,830	1,707,000	1,990,000	2,828,000	1,334,000	3,212,000	2,208,000
Zambia	475,353	411,115	296,866	281,389	302,720	351,416	267,490
Serbia	398,556	540,205	751,578	700,502	645,607	461,272	576,446
France	375,820	439,350	406,810	428,530	398,480	415,202	338,955
Benin	306,198	291,279	253,954	257,000	221,977	164,761	156,901
Indonesia	301,000	215,000	291,000	424,000	953,571	538,729	859,653
Romania	258,530	367,740	340,820	440,120	492,680	393,495	263,380
Kazakhstan	250,385	237,845	260,639	282,185	255,437	252,319	231,168
Austria	248,420	237,830	204,860	217,780	186,490	193,416	152,599
Japan	242,800	246,500	218,900	217,800	211,300	253,000	238,000
Mexico	241,371	288,203	246,019	232,680	324,011	432,927	509,114
Togo	236,450	207,604	154,545	124,638	92,373	60,348	41,084
Malawi	220,000	264,497	210,000	180,000	175,475	208,556	132,417
Iran	210,000	200,000	190,000	180,000	160,000	140,000	139,325
Ghana	200,000	190,000	182,000	180,000	176,700	170,490	143,220
Croatia	194,770	227,870	266,010	244,280	245,190	207,765	244,075
Ethiopia	190,000	185,522	208,676	125,623	149,455	86,468	81,235
North Korea	180,000	190,000	229,892	263,920	135,280	223,325	282,000
Turkey	155,000	182,000	155,225	150,000	140,000	140,000	165,000
Burkina Faso	198,540	106,675	98,513	51,708	31,314	18,500	25,851
Colombia	141,987	122,491	119,412	114,056	92,231	80,106	80,548
Uganda	140,000	265,870	160,000	126,000	107,624	28,097	25,730
Hungary	134,470	156,580	165,760	169,570	181,240	179,282	184,725
Myanmar	131,223	133,664	135,132	141,939	143,717	145,465	149,185
South Korea	129,925	110,781	80,926	105,340	89,410	85,644	75,448
Germany	120,500	106,600	90,500	84,100	58,700	66,000	43,000

=== 10,000–100,000 tonnes ===
Country	2022	2021	2020	2019	2018	2017	2016
Slovakia	98,760	165,160	132,200	119,660	106,960	102,441	92,484
Bangladesh	98,646	91,176	104,761	110,785	98,699	96,921	92,181
Cameroon	97,703	110,043	93,192	65,190	59,681	57,452	41,276
Czech Republic	65,540	51,460	33,020	27,840	25,260	37,012	27,972
Australia	57,200	40,219	17,323	15,136	28,903	31,335	29,403
Cambodia	56,436	63,024	47,497	42,100	91,800	73,300	69,400
Vietnam	52,146	59,138	65,405	77,263	81,348	101,856	160,696
Zimbabwe	51,408	54,404	59,656	23,043	69,688	36,478	47,755
Mozambique	50,000	115,000	75,000	55,000	55,000	50,000	47,000
Poland	43,780	20,970	15,960	15,540	10,390	20,297	14,747
Guatemala	43,000	42,000	41,000	39,000	38,000	38,000	38,000
Bosnia and Herzegovina	42,642	24,883	37,202	23,753	23,332	11,740	18,662
Tanzania	41,069	75,000	45,000	22,953	21,321	6,135	6,711
Egypt	38,000	62,586	36,420	36,260	46,997	36,388	45,165
Angola	37,374	37,317	37,961	37,350	35,266	36,001	15,740
Nepal	35,138	30,648	34,544	31,567	27,681	29,061	28,917
Uzbekistan	34,862	29,473	7,460	10,858	11,399	6,138	232
Rwanda	34,056	26,857	23,755	24,526	22,809	23,934	21,942
Moldova	32,400	50,500	33,360	64,239	57,684	46,524	42,125
Ecuador	29,454	20,077	27,238	39,515	25,504	35,006	41,788
Belize	27,135	17,308	13,670	7,819	11,776	13,037	7,779
Democratic Republic of the Congo	27,007	26,336	25,682	25,044	24,427	22,150	21,608
Thailand	20,802	21,234	22,800	26,283	41,165	42,829	37,765
Mali	20,070	15,904	14,685	10,440	6,693	5,801	11,769
Laos	14,772	14,481	14,594	12,172	8,380	7,960	19,130
Bulgaria	10,180	2,810	6,200	7,570	4,730	20,000	18,301
Nicaragua	10,000	10,000	10,000	10,000	5,693	5,693	5,693

=== <10,000 tonnes ===
Country	2022	2021	2020	2019	2018	2017	2016
Switzerland	6,175	5,832	5,247	5,350	3,740	5,642	4,500
Venezuela	6,091	7,580	6,736	4,584	11,951	7,855	1,720
Slovenia	5,340	4,810	5,010	4,240	5,330	7,713	7,387
El Salvador	5,205	5,201	5,229	5,185	5,189	5,314	5,052
Taiwan	5,000	4,194	4,447	4,776	4,404	4,674	3,061
Gabon	3,932	3,945	3,936	3,916	3,981	3,911	3,857
Sri Lanka	3,842	3,794	7,879	2,197	2,500	14,363	9,830
Spain	3,790	4,770	4,620	5,170	4,350	4,599	2,869
Liberia	3,348	3,341	3,362	3,342	3,319	3,254	3,157
Kyrgyzstan	3,076	2,816	2,371	2,835	2,872	3,512	1,240
Georgia	3,000	3,000	4,000	2,000	2,000	2,000	2,000
Burundi	2,410	2,427	2,498	2,564	2,387	2,167	2,395
Syria	2,350	4,458	6,227	2,086	1,727	3,901	3,550
Lithuania	2,290	2,230	2,560	2,310	3,450		
Kenya	2,000	2,281	2,396	2,396	2,398	2,518	2,007
Honduras	1,619	1,645	1,623	2,033	2,180	2,210	2,200
Peru	1,596	1,683	1,534	1,475	1,530	1,581	1,371
Cuba	1,000	1,000					
Morocco	1,000	1,000	1,000	1,000	1,000	1,000	1,000
East Timor	821	362	852	868	888	899	968
Albania	686	373	441	605	744	500	664
Greece	680	1,230	1,840	3,720	2,520	8,099	9,465
Philippines	626	407	554	659	658	666	544
Ivory Coast	575	573	557	593	570	509	700
Panama	98	98	98	99	95	100	101
North Macedonia	73	50	50	65	64	34	1
Bhutan	58	90	234	171	107	204	254
Madagascar	46	47	47	47	47	47	46
Iraq	33	34	33	33	35	33	31
Azerbaijan	30	30	29	30	29	29	33
Tajikistan	21	20	20	21	21	21	21
Luxembourg	20	20	30				
Pakistan	9	48	201	15	28	19	40
Suriname	4	5	5	11	7	7	7

== Production by country per capita ==
Here's the top 10 country with the highest production of soybean per capita.

Rank	Country	Kg per person	Region
1	Paraguay	1,566.14	South America
2	Argentina	849.27	South America
3	Brazil	562.62	South America
4	Uruguay	380.49	South America
5	United States	377.29	North America
6	Bolivia	260.19	South America
7	Canada	195.26	North America
8	Ukraine	105.54	Europe
9	Serbia	92.21	Europe
10	Croatia	58.48	Europe
