= National Cocoa and Coffee Board =

Cameroonian regulatory body

National Cocoa and Coffee Board of Cameroon(ONCC-NCCB)
- Established: 1991
- Headquarters: Bonanjo-Douala, Cameroon
- Website: oncc.cm

The National Cocoa and Coffee Board (NCCB) is an autonomous Cameroonian government establishment created in 1991 to oversee the sustainability, marketing, quality control, information-dissemination, and the promotion of the image of Cameroon's Cocoa and Coffee. Though the establishment was created following the dissolution of the National Produce Marketing Board (NPMB) and eventual liberalization of the sector, NCCB remains the official body on all cocoa and coffee matters of Cameroon, Africa's 4th and the world's 5th largest producer of cocoa, with 232,530 metric tons (228,860 long tons) produced during the 2014/2015 season.

== Duty ==
The National Cocoa and Coffee Board (NCCB) is charged with:

- Controlling and guaranteeing the quality of cocoa and coffee.
- Monitoring the statistics of exports, along with the cocoa and coffee marketing seasons.
- Defending and promoting the brand image of Cameroon origin.
- Deploring and taking measures to streamline and valorize the marketing of produce, their derivatives as well as promote the marketing process.
- Overseeing the dissemination of information and guarantee a smooth functioning of all activities in the sector.
- Assuring adequate training of sector operators so as to enhance professionalism.
- Monitoring international cocoa and coffee agreements and represent Cameroon at international cocoa and coffee sessions.

== Management ==
The board of directors is made up of ten members and is presided over by a president appointed by presidential decree. The general directorate is under the responsibility of a managing director assisted by a deputy managing director, who coordinate the policy and management of the establishment.

- Board chairman – H.E Luc Ayang
- General manager – Michael Ndoping
- Deputy general manager – El Hadji. Nana Abdoulaye
- Technical adviser – N.1: Adzogo Richard
- Director of trade and statistics – Akamba Ava Michelle
- Director of quality – Mutgnie Elie B.
- Director of promotion and international cooperation – Wangbitchin Gilbert
- Director of administrative and financial affairs – Napoleon Nyake Besong
