= Coffee production in Peru =

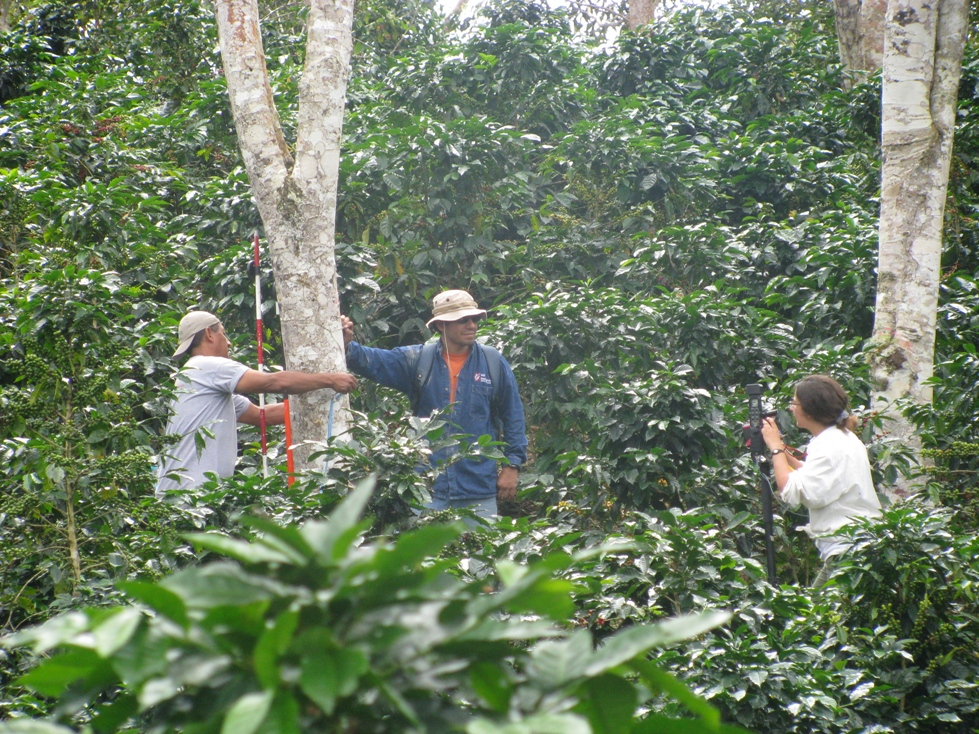
Carbon monitoring in a Peruvian coffee plantation

Peru is one of the top 20 coffee producers in the world as of 2014. It ranks fifth in the export of Arabica in the world market.

== History ==
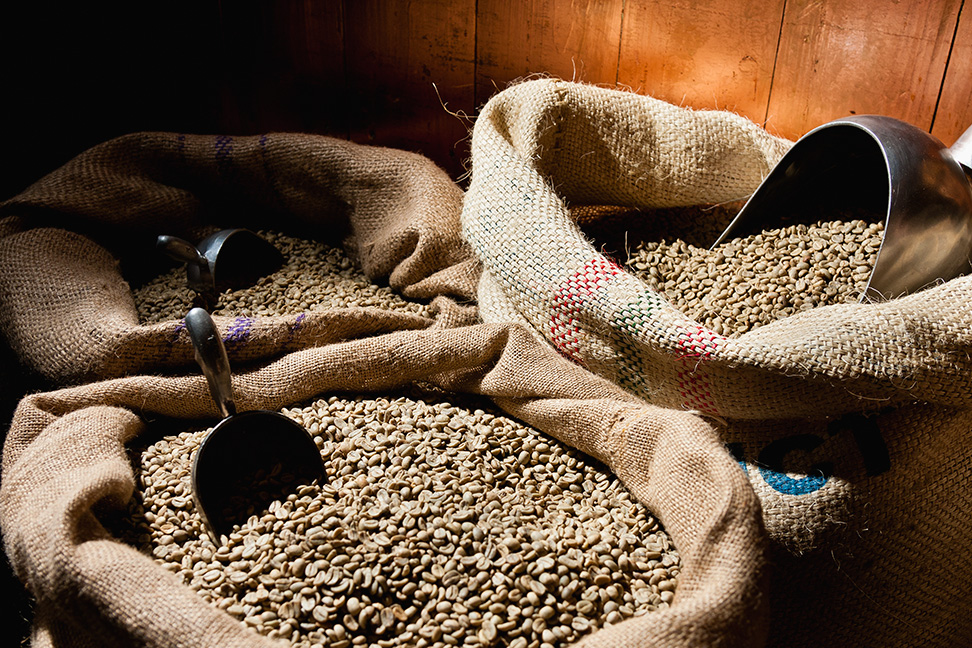
Terra Nera coffee beans

In 1895, the Journal of the Society of Arts recorded that Peru was known for many years as a coffee-producing country, but the coffee grown on the coast was used primarily for domestic consumption, and it was only later that it developed as an exporting nation. Coffee planting began, and coffee is still cultivated near the port of Pacasmayo. Coffee has been cultivated in the south, in the districts of Sandia and Carabaya, and in the centre of Peru in the valleys of Chanchamayu, Viloc, and Huánuco. Production in Chanchamayo district was facilitated by the completion of the Central (or Oroya Railway) by the Peruvian Corporation. The Chanchamayu Valley, itself about 10 miles (16 km) long, was in the hands of private plantation owners, while the Perené, Paucartambo, and Rio Colorado valleys, were later linked by railway. The first exports of coffee, to Germany and England, did not begin until 1887.

In the 1970s, large dry mills were sited near ports, the transportation network along the Pacific was considered ideal, a model where quantity of production rather than quality was important. This model has changed in recent times with the Agricultural Ministry introducing modern methods, encouraging farmer organizations such as the CENFROCAFE in Jaén, a mountainous area of the Andes.

== Coffee cooperative ==
CENFROCAFE is a cooperative with more than 80 farm associations as well as six dry mill processing and finishing associations. Under this practice, the produce is marketed by the finance, marketing and sales office in Jaen, with direct accessibility to international export markets, ultimately benefitting several hundreds of coffee growers of the region. All the coffee marketed by the associations is from an area above 1,000 metres (3,300 ft) elevation. This organization has facilitated a large number of farm families access to international markets. The coffee marketed through CENFROCAFE, to the extent of about 92%, is organic; 100% is certified as Fair Trade. This has resulted in improved quality, and greater demand for Peruvian coffee in the international market, at competitive rates. The processing of coffee in Peru is mostly by wet milling on the site of the plantations. By this process, the moisture content of the coffee seeds is reduced to about 20% and then it is transported to the dry mills. However, this decentralized system is unfavorable for coffee growing areas of northern Peru as it has led to quality inconsistencies, promotion of rot and the growth of fungus.

== Production ==
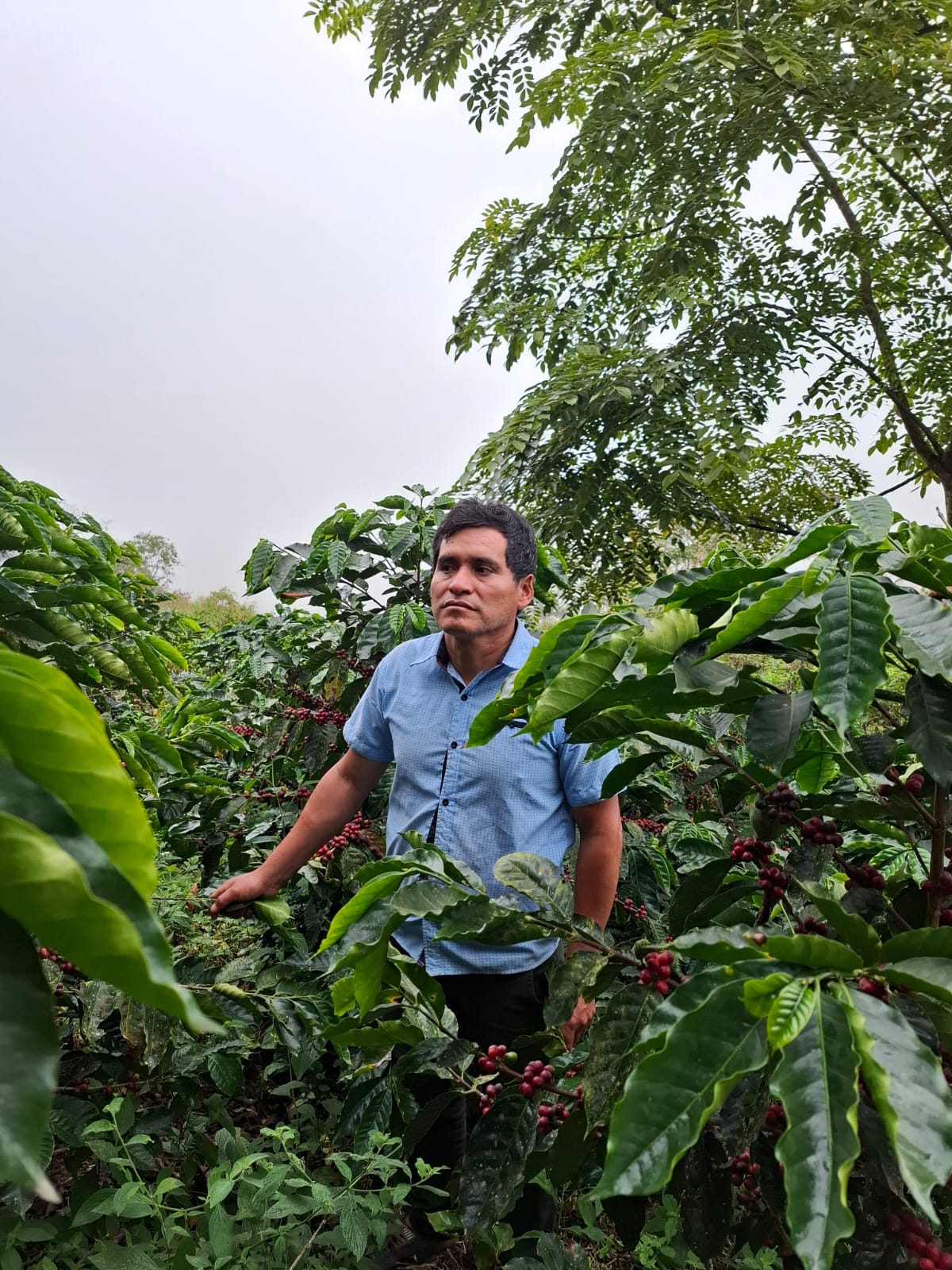
A coffee plantation and a coffee farmer in Piura

The three prominent coffee growing areas, located in the eastern slopes of the Andes, are Chanchamayo, the Amazonas and San Martin regions, and the southern highlands. St Ignacio, close to the Ecuadorian border, is the centralized area of coffee plantations in northern Peru. Arabica is the dominant coffee crop, 70% of which is Typica, 20% is caturra, and the remainder being of other types. About 75% of the coffee growing area lies at an elevation range of 1,000–1,800 metres (3,300–5,900 ft), and planting done in the shaded areas is to the extent of 2,000 plants per ha. Farming is done largely by small farmers, and coffee is handpicked. Organic coffee is grown on 90,000 hectares (220,000 acres).

Coffee production in 1893 was about 1,500 tons. According to FAO statistics for 2013, coffee production was 256,241 tons from an area of 399,523 hectares (987,240 acres) with a yield level of 6,414 hectogram per ha.

Coffee produced in the country is mostly exported, and during 2012, 264,343 tons was exported to US, Germany, Belgium, Colombia, Sweden and others, while internal consumption was limited to about 10%. During 2014, coffee rust disease (Hemileia vastatris) affected 130,000 hectares (320,000 acres) in the central highlands of the country causing a decline of 6% in production vis-à-vis the 2013 figure; compared to the highest ever production of 30,900 tons, the shortfall was 15%.

== Coffee Consumption ==
Although Peru is one of the larger coffee producers globally and over 200,000 people depend on its production Peru's coffee consumption is low. Current per capita consumption is estimated at only about 600-800g per year.

According to Kantar the roasted and instant coffee market is estimated at ~ USD110MM. It is estimated that in 2018 household volume consumption grew 3,4% and during 2020 6%. This is a clear indication of the migration of quality coffee consumption across new generation demographics. In 2018 ground coffee consumption grew 26% in value, and purchasing frequency grew 6% to 30 per year. Instant coffee remains the most important category growing 4.4% in value and 2.6% in volume.

Apart from the larger brands such as Altomayo, 338, Juan Valdez from Colombia, Britt,Nescafe, or Starbucks, who has over 100 shops across the country, the opening of “independent" specialty coffee shops and roasters is driving consumption of single origin coffee. Independent shops and specialty roasters include Origen Tostadores de Cafe, Coffee Road, D'Sala Caffe, PukuPuku and many more.

== See also ==
- List of countries by coffee production

== Bibliography ==
- The Society (1895). Journal of the Society of Arts.
