= International Coffee Organization =

Coffee organization

International Coffee Organization: Organización Internacional del Café (Spanish); Organização Internacional do Café (Portuguese); Organisation Internationale du Café (French)
- Logo

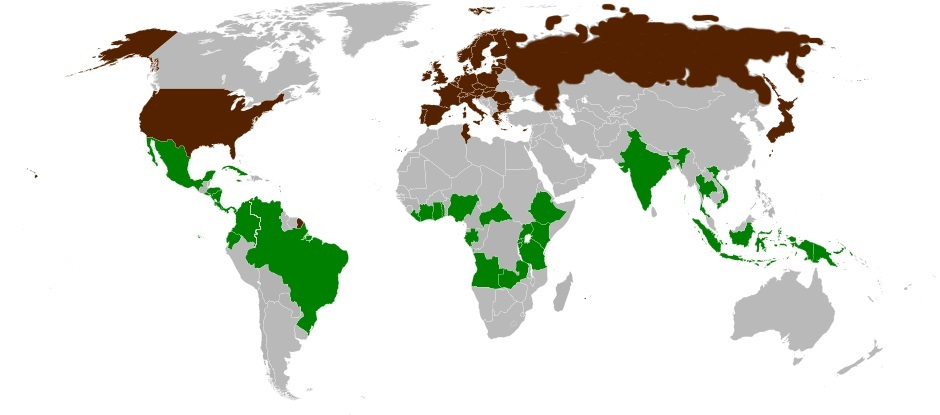
- ICO exporting members ICO importing members
- Headquarters: London, WC1; United Kingdom
- Official languages: English; French; Portuguese; Spanish
- Type: Trade bloc
- Members: Exporting: Angola; Bolivia; Brazil; Burundi; Cameroon; Central African Republic; Colombia; Costa Rica; Côte d'Ivoire; Cuba; Dem. Rep. Congo; Ecuador; El Salvador; Ethiopia; Gabon; Ghana; Guatemala; Honduras; India; Indonesia; Kenya; Liberia; Madagascar; Malawi; Mexico; Nepal; Nicaragua; Panama; Papua New Guinea; Paraguay; Peru; Philippines; Rwanda; Sierra Leone; Tanzania; Thailand; Timor-Leste; Togo; Uganda; Vietnam; Yemen; Zambia; Zimbabwe; Importing: European Union; Japan; Norway; Russian Fed.; Switzerland; Tunisia; United Kingdom

Leaders
  - Executive director: (Brazil) Vanusia Nogueira
- Establishment: 1963; 62 years ago
- Currency: Indexed as USD-per-lb
- Website www.ico.org

The International Coffee Organization (ICO) was set up in 1963 in London under the auspices of the United Nations (UN) due to the economic importance of coffee. It administers the International Coffee Agreement (ICA) which is an important instrument for development cooperation.

The ICO was a result of the five-year International Coffee Agreement (ICA) signed in 1962 at the UN in New York City. The ICA was renegotiated in 1968, 1976, 1983, 1994, and 2007 at the ICO in London. The ICA administers a quota system to stabilize fluctuating coffee prices across the world between coffee producing and consuming countries.

The mission of the ICO is "...to strengthen the global coffee sector and promote its sustainable expansion in a market-based environment for the benefit of all actors in the Global Coffee Value Chain (G-CVC)."

The ICO's headquarters is located at 222 Gray's Inn Road in London and its current executive director is the Brazilian Vanúsia Nogueira.

The United States officially withdrew from the International Coffee Agreement in June 2018. As of February 2, 2022, ICO Member Governments represent 93% of world coffee production and 63% of world consumption.

== Purpose ==
The ICO serves as a watchdog for the coffee trade and allocates votes based on coffee production in each country. Countries are split into producer and consumer nations, allocating each side 50% voting power. Brazil, as the largest exporter of coffee, was allocated the most votes of the producing countries while the United States, as the largest importer of coffee, was allocated the most votes of the consuming countries. The ICO serves as a watchdog by keeping track of exports and imports and by administering quotas under the 1962 ICA to coffee consuming and producing countries. Imports are monitored by the original importing member countries of the ICA and reported to the ICO, who issues quota-based stamps to producing countries. Consuming countries agreed to not accept any coffee without a stamp to keep the quotas in place. Monitoring quotas and establishing limitations is important to protect producers and consumers by creating an equilibrium that avoids price escalation while keeping fair wages for coffee growers. It also helps to keep conditions fair for coffee farm workers by keeping production at a reasonable level.

== Structure ==
The International Coffee Council is the highest authority of the organization and is composed of representatives of each member government. It meets in March and September to discuss coffee matters, approve strategic documents and consider the recommendations of advisory bodies and committees. Its decisions are made by consensus.

Apart from the International Coffee Council, there is the Finance and Administration Committee which provides the ICC with recommendations on financial issues such as approvals of the administrative budget and the annual accounts of the organization. The Joint Committee handles matters previously considered by the Projects, Statistics, and Promotion and Market Development Committees during the transition from ICA 2007 to ICA 2022.

== Membership ==
As of 2 February 2022, it has 42 producing members and 7 importing members.

Exporting Member Countries

- Angola
- Bolivia
- Brazil
- Burundi
- Cameroon
- Central African Republic
- Colombia
- Costa Rica
- Côte d'Ivoire
- Cuba
- Democratic Republic of the Congo
- Ecuador
- El Salvador
- Ethiopia
- Gabon
- Ghana
- Honduras
- India
- Indonesia
- Kenya
- Liberia
- Madagascar
- Malawi
- Mexico
- Nepal
- Nicaragua
- Nigeria
- Panama
- Papua New Guinea
- Peru
- Philippines
- Rwanda
- Sierra Leone
- Tanzania
- Thailand
- Timor-Leste
- Togo
- Venezuela
- Vietnam
- Yemen
- Zambia
- Zimbabwe

Importing Member Countries

- European Union
- Japan
- Norway
- Russia
- Switzerland
- Tunisia
- United Kingdom

Former Member Countries

- Turkey (withdrew on 12 February 2017)
- United States (withdrew on 27 June 2018)
- Paraguay (withdrew on 26 November 2019)
- Guatemala (withdrew on 30 September 2020)
- Uganda (withdrew on 2 February 2022)

== See also ==
- Economics of coffee
- International Coffee Day
