= List of countries by coffee production =

This is a list of countries by coffee production, based on data from the Food and Agriculture Organization (FAO) for 2023. This data covers the production of green coffee beans, the primary ingredient in the production of processed coffee. Roasting and packaging of ground coffee often takes place after it has been exported from the producing nation; see the separate list of countries by coffee exports.

Coffee is a cash crop in many areas, with the amount produced for export significantly in excess of local demand. Several of these countries maintain substantial supply-chain relations with the world's largest coffeehouse chains and enterprises. Often these coffeehouse chains pay a premium above market price in order to alleviate fair trade and sustainable farming concerns. Developing countries that participate in the coffee market wield considerable influence on global coffee economics.

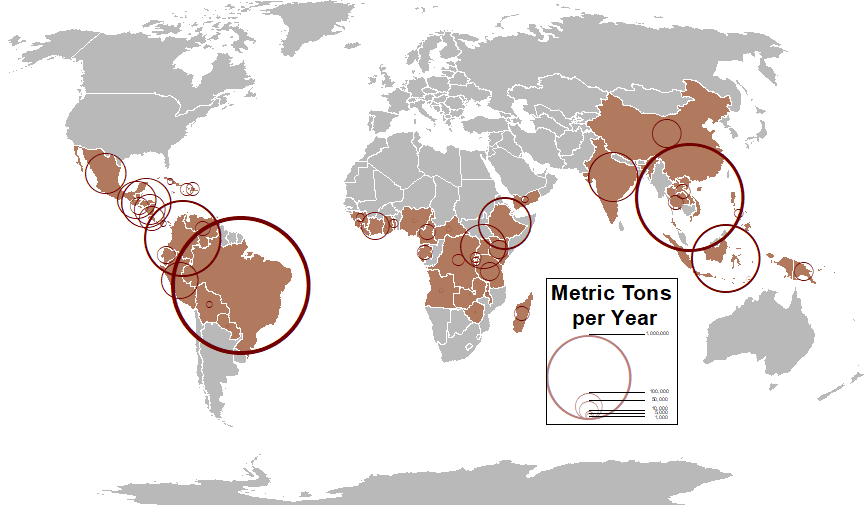
A world map of countries by coffee production, 2019

Coffee cultivation by type of coffee:
r Coffea canephora
m Coffea canephora and Coffea arabica
a Coffea arabica

== List of countries by production ==
In 2023, world production of green coffee was 11.1 million tonnes, led by Brazil with 30.8% of the total. Other major producers were Vietnam (17.7%) and Indonesia (6.8%). 41% of the world's coffee was produced in South America, 27% in South-East Asia, 17% in Africa and 10% in Central America.

A total of 81 countries and territories were recorded by the FAO as producing coffee in 2023, with 53 producing more than 1,000 tonnes and 36, listed below, producing more than 10,000 tonnes. The smallest with a known production volume was the Cook Islands, producing just 370kg of coffee.^{α}

Major countries for green coffee production – 2023
Country	Production (tonnes)
World	11,064,205
Brazil	3,405,267
Vietnam	1,956,782
Indonesia	760,192
Colombia	680,858
Ethiopia	559,400
Honduras	384,361
Uganda	384,000
Peru	369,551
India	332,848
Central African Republic	316,108
Guatemala	225,327
Guinea	200,000
Mexico	194,916
Laos	177,662
Nicaragua	143,337
China^{β}	108,000
Other nations and territories	96,180
Ivory Coast	91,327
Costa Rica	78,822
Tanzania	62,917
Democratic Republic of the Congo	62,217
Venezuela	56,381
Madagascar	49,344
Kenya	48,700
Papua New Guinea	45,371
El Salvador	32,326
Yemen	30,291
Philippines	30,023
Rwanda	27,104
Cambodia	24,266
Bolivia	23,579
Dominican Republic	23,446
Togo	22,895
Angola	20,071
Thailand	16,575
Panama	12,760
Malawi	11,000

== Notes ==
^α Three countries - Mauritius, Saint Lucia, and Saudi Arabia - have not had figures reported by the FAO since the 1990s but are still included in the data; all three continue to produce coffee at a small scale. They are counted here as producing nations but not included in the global totals.
^β Values for China are estimated by the ICO.

== See also ==
- Coffee production in Brazil
- Coffee production in Colombia
- Coffee production in Costa Rica
- Coffee production in Indonesia
- Coffee production in Ethiopia
- Coffee production in Guatemala
- Coffee production in Hawaii
- Coffee production in India
- Coffee production in Kenya
- Coffee production in Mexico
- Coffee production in Papua New Guinea
- Coffee production in Peru
- Coffee production in the Philippines
- Coffee production in Rwanda
- Coffee production in Vietnam
- Coffee wars
- List of coffeehouse chains
