= Agriculture in Mexico =

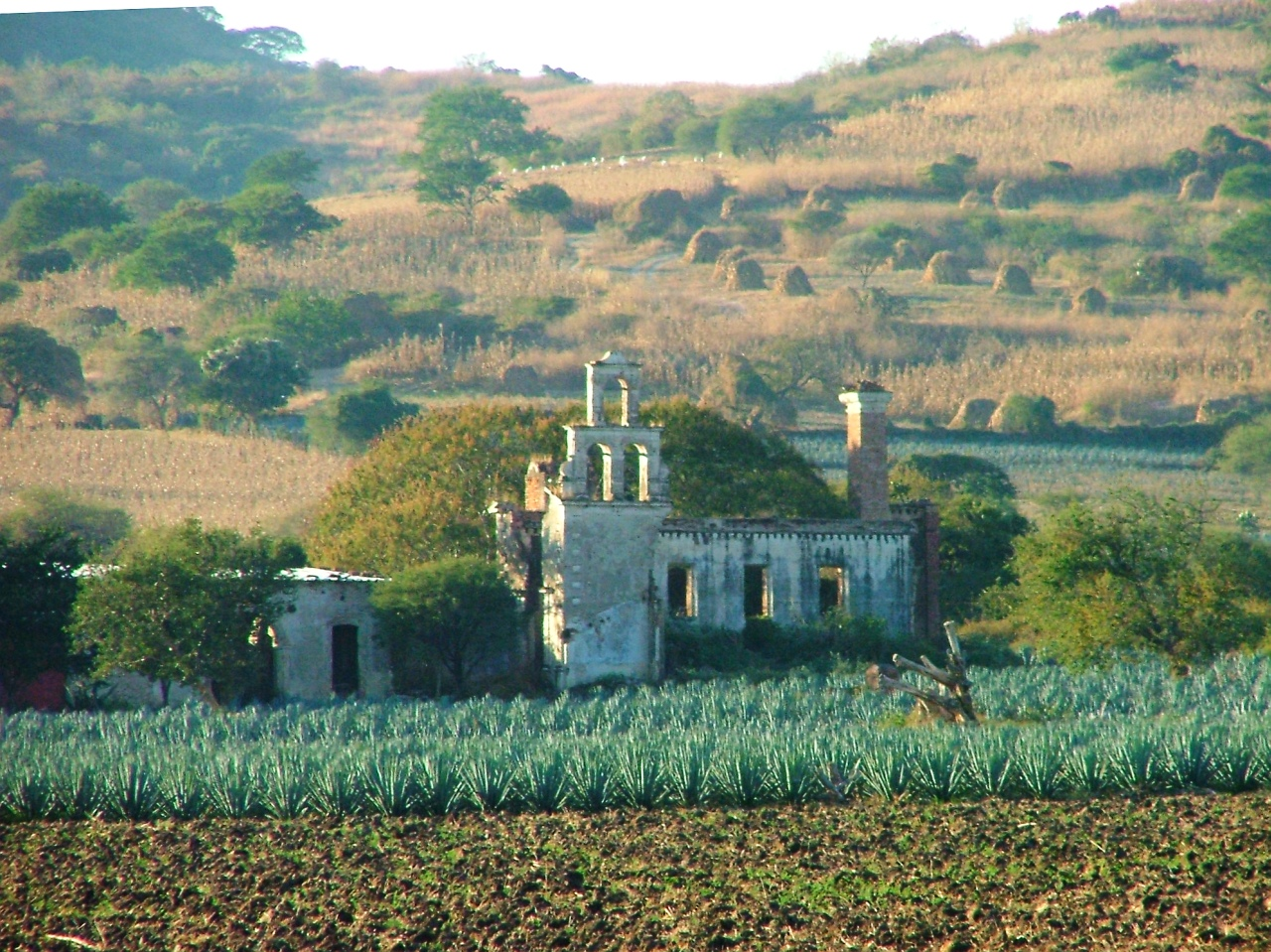
Agave plants and a ruined hacienda house in Jalisco

Agriculture in Mexico has been an important sector of the country’s economy historically and politically even though it now accounts for a very small percentage of Mexico’s GDP. Mexico is one of the cradles of agriculture with the Mesoamericans developing domesticated plants such as maize, beans, tomatoes, squash, cotton, vanilla, avocados, cacao, and various spices. Domestic turkeys and Muscovy ducks were the only domesticated fowl in the precolumbian era, and small dogs were also raised for food. There were no large domesticated animals, such as cattle or pigs.

During the early colonial period, the Spanish introduced more plants and the concept of animal husbandry, principally cattle, horses, donkeys, mules, goats and sheep, and barnyard animals such as chickens and pigs. Farming from the colonial period until the Mexican Revolution was focused on large private properties. After the Revolution, these were broken up and the land redistributed. Since the latter 20th century NAFTA and economic policies have again favoured large scale commercial agricultural holdings.

Mexico’s main crops include grains such as corn and wheat, tropical fruits and various vegetables. Agricultural exports are important, especially coffee, tropical fruits and winter fruits and vegetables. Sixty percent of Mexico’s agricultural exports go to the United States.

== History of agriculture in Mexico ==
=== Mesoamerican period ===
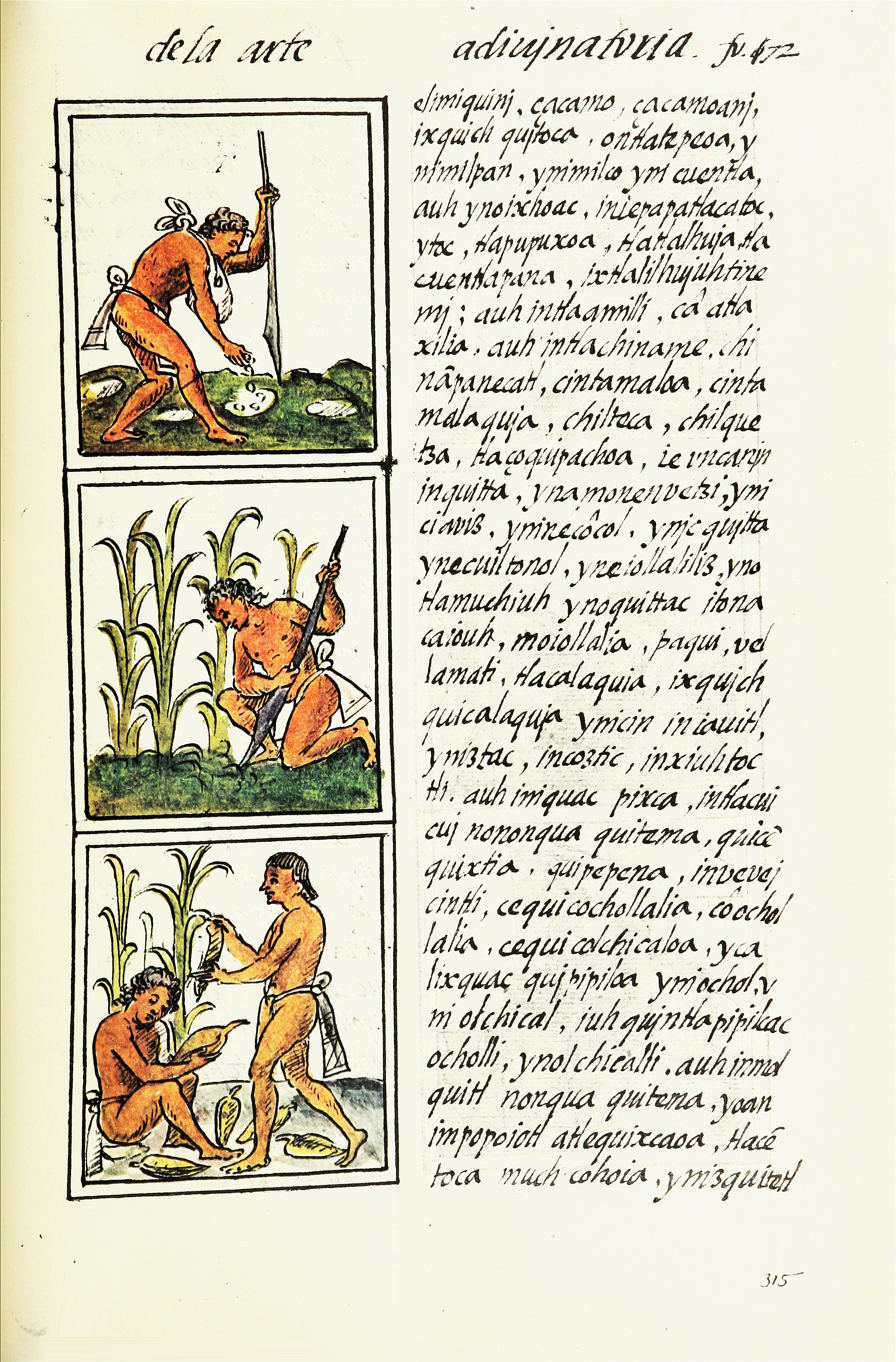
Aztec maize agriculture as depicted in the Florentine Codex

The territory of Mexico roughly corresponds with that of Mesoamerica, which was one of the cradles of plant domestication. Archeological research in the Gulf coast of Tabasco shows the earliest evidence of corn cultivation in Mexico. The first fields were along the Grijalva River delta with fossilized pollen evidence showing forest clearing around 5100 BCE. The domestication of corn is followed by sunflower seeds and cotton.

Agriculture was the basis of the major Mesoamerican civilizations such as the Olmecs, Mayas and Aztecs, with the principal crops being corn, beans, squash, chili peppers and tomatoes. The tradition of planting corn, beans and squash together allows the beans to replace the nitrogen that corn depletes from the soil. The three crops together are sometimes referred to as the Three Sisters.

Soil erosion from corn production has been a problem since the Mesoamerican period. This and other kinds of environmental degradation have been cited as the cause of the collapse of the Teotihuacan civilization. To create new areas for cultivation, Mesoamericans harvested rainfall, developed lakeshore irrigation systems and created new fields in the form of terraces and "chinampas" artificial floating islands in shallow waters.

=== Colonial period ===
Although silver mining brought many Spaniards to Mexico and silver was the largest single export from New Spain, agriculture was extremely important. There were far more people working in agriculture, not only producing subsistence crops for individual households and small-scale producers for local markets, but also commercial agriculture on large estates (haciendas) to supply Spanish cities. In the early conquest period, Spaniards relied on crops produced by indigenous in central Mexico and rendered as tribute, mainly maize, following existing arrangements. Some Spaniards were awarded grants by the crown of indigenous tribute and labor in the conquest-era institution of encomienda, which was phased out replaced by indigenous labor allocations by the crown (repartimiento), finally wage labor or other non-coerced labor arrangements.

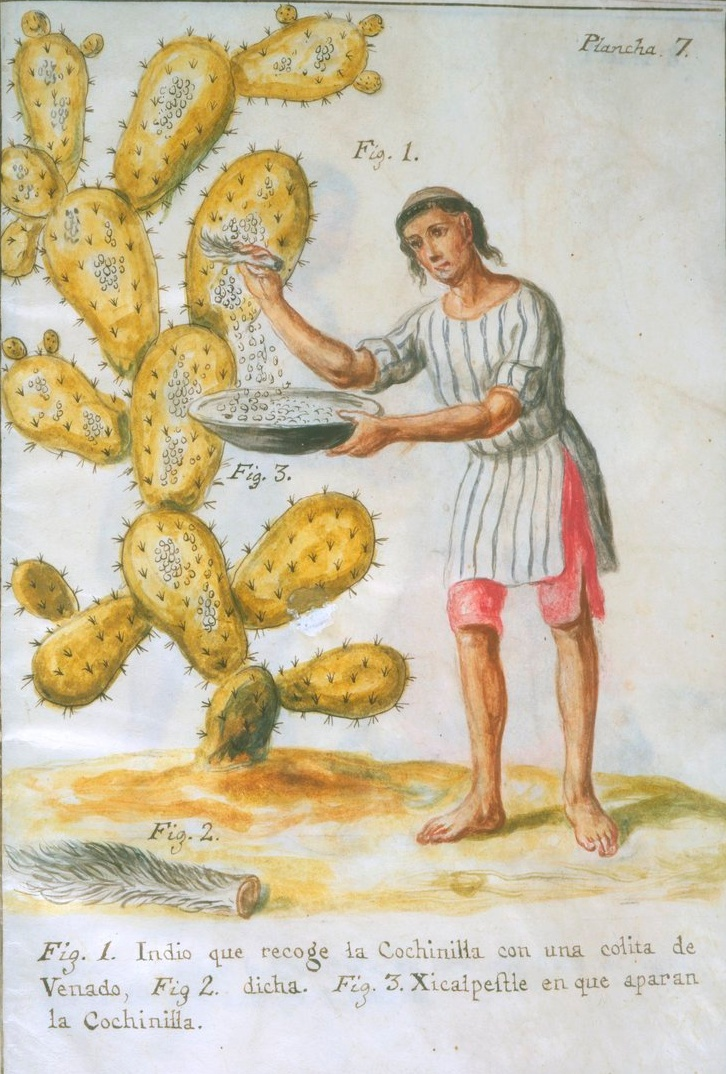
Indian Collecting Cochineal from a nopal cactus with a Deer Tail by José Antonio de Alzate y Ramírez (1777)

In central Mexico, the rise of the Spanish population in and the drop in indigenous population in the sixteenth century saw Spaniards acquiring land, creating haciendas and smaller farms called ranchos. Much productive land was held by indigenous villages, with the protection of the crown, but long-term trend over the colonial era and the nineteenth century was the transfer of those lands into non-indigenous hands. Haciendas have been well studied in Mexico, starting with François Chevalier's highly influential work, followed by assessments of whether his generalizations held for regions of Mexico.' Studies found that haciendas were, in fact, not inefficiently organized and badly managed, nor did the concentration in land ownership result in waste and misallocation of resources. Hacienda owners (hacendados) sought to maximize income and minimize production costs, economically rational behavior. In economic terms, benefited in ways that small holders and indigenous communities could not, since they had economies of scale, access to outside credit, information about new technologies and distant markets, a level of protection from predatory officials, and greater security of tenure." Although haciendas had advantages of scale in producing crops such as wheat and in ranching of cattle and sheep smaller producers of fruits, fresh vegetables, and small animals (pigs, chickens and their eggs) supplied local markets. In Mexico City, chinampa agriculture was highly productive and labor intensive, supplying the capital, with land continuing to be held by indigenous farmers into the twentieth century.

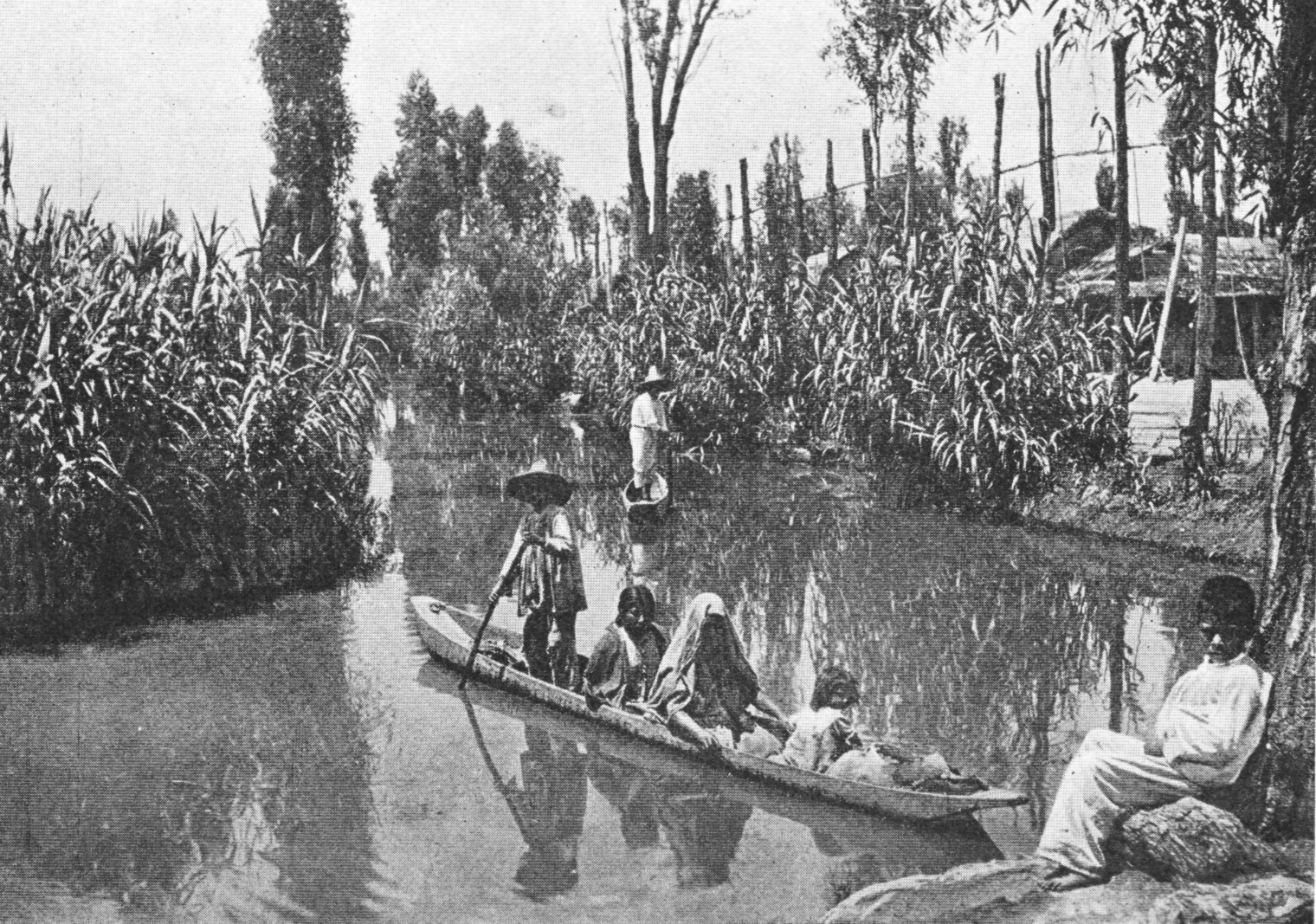
Chinampas and canals, 1912.

The Spanish introduced a number of new crops such as wheat, barley, sugar, fruits (such as pear, apple, fig, apricot, and bananas) and vegetables, but their main contributions were domesticated animals, unknown in Mesoamerica. The Spanish brought cattle, horses, goats, and sheep as part of what is now called the Columbian Exchange. These animals often caused damage to indigenous crops in central Mexico, but outside the zone of intense indigenous settlement and cultivation, cattle and sheep were grazed on land not previously devoted to agriculture. Sheep grazed on previously cultivated land had disastrous environmental consequences, documented in a classic of Mexican environmental history. Many breeds of the animals the Spaniards imported are still raised today called "criollos."

With the discovery and exploitation of large-scale silver deposits in Zacatecas and Guanajuato, cultivated areas outside of traditional agriculture expanded, particularly in the Bajío, which became the bread basket of Mexico producing the imported grain, wheat. Unlike central Mexico, which had a long indigenous tradition of sedentary agriculture, much of the Bajío was a marshy wetland not continuously occupied or cultivated. For the Spaniards, the Bajío was a disappointment, since there were no deposits of precious metals and no indigenous populations with existing hierarchies, but the region did show promise for initially the grazing of cattle and later agriculture. With population growth in silver mining cities in the eighteenth century, agriculture expanded and cattle grazing was displaced to more marginal lands and declined in importance. Agriculture in the region was productive, but was not technologically innovative. The bottom lands were rich in nutrients Spaniards had no sense that access to productive land was restricted, which might have sparked innovation in cultivation. However, the shaping of the regions hydrology with dams and canals in the eighteenth century made possible wheat cultivation on a large scale. Spaniards developed irrigated agriculture, with the construction of canals and dams, marshy land was drained and redirected.

A number of native plant and animal species from Mexico proved to have commercial value in Europe, leading to their mass cultivation and export including cochineal and indigo (for dyes), cacao, vanilla, henequen (for rope), cotton, and tobacco. A high quality, fast red dye from small cochineal insects that were cultivated and collected from the nopal cactuses on which they thrived was an extremely important export to Europe, the second most valuable after silver. Cochineal production was labor intense and largely remained in indigenous hands. Mesoamerican staple foods, especially maize, continued to be important. In the eighteenth century, when the Spanish crown was seeking new sources of income, it created a monopoly on tobacco production and processing, restricting cultivation to areas around Orizaba.

Recent assessments of the Roman Catholic Church's role in the Mexican economy have examined the hypothesis that the church was a major drag on the Mexican economy. The church was the recipient of the tithe, a tax on agricultural production, but with indigenous communities exempt from the tithe and considerable number of haciendas owned by the church itself, it has been argued that more land remained in indigenous and church hands than otherwise would be expected. Since the church functioned as the main source of credit to elites, its lending to them at below market rates cost the church revenue and increased the wealth of those acquiring the credit. The church owned considerable land in its own right. An advantage of church-owned haciendas over privately held ones was that unlike individual hacendados, whose deaths triggered a division of property among the heirs, the church as a corporation continued to consolidate its wealth over time.

=== 19th century ===
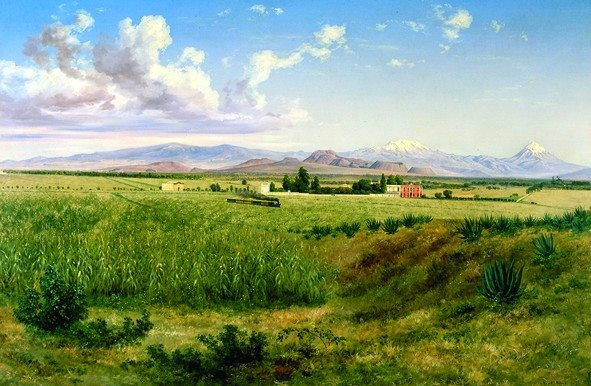
Hacienda de San Antonio Coapa and a train, by José María Velasco (1840—1912).

Land tenure and agricultural production continued along the patterns of the colonial era even after the Mexican War of Independence (1810–21). Much of the fighting had taken place in the Bajío, Mexico's bread basket, and the silver mines were damaged as well, so there were factors that led to stagnation in agriculture there. Political turmoil in the post-independence era was an obstacle to economic growth, but agriculture itself did not put a drag on it. One economic historian considers Mexico's "pre-capitalist agricultural organisation" one of Mexico's several obstacles to industrial development. Low rates of economic growth generally were also due to the lack of a national market and high transportation costs. Most Mexicans were subsistence farmers using rain as the main source of water for their crops. In the post-independence era, much agricultural land was in the hands of corporate owners, that is the Roman Catholic Church and indigenous communities, and those lands could not be alienated under colonial law and its continuation in the early republic (1822-1855). They could not be rented or used as collateral for potentially more profitable enterprises. Mexican liberals targeted corporate ownership of land during the Liberal Reform era, and the landed wealth of the church was expropriated, but much land was still held by indigenous communities. Political turmoil continued until the last quarter of the nineteenth century with the coup by liberal army general Porfirio Díaz. Once he had consolidated power, large haciendas were encouraged to develop commercial farming for export, made possible by the building of railroads to take products to market at low freight rates. Railroads were built using foreign capital and by extending land concessions to the entrepreneurs. Much indigenous land was usurped and land prices where railway lines were built soared. Displaced agricultural workers found temporary employment building railway lines. Indigenous village lands that had largely escaped the Liberal Reform were now expropriated at rapid rates. Large haciendas became profitable again, reversing a trend toward gradual disintegration into smaller units. Expropriated church lands remained in the hands of large-scale producers. Landless indigenous villagers became rural or urban wage laborers.

When wheat production in the U.S. and Canada expanded in the nineteenth century and mechanized reapers developed, the binding of cut wheat for later threshing opened a market for the commercial development of the henequen industry in Yucatán. Henequen production on a large scale had never been commercially viable before, but the production of henequen for cordage rapidly became a major export product to the U.S. and Canada. Cotton production was the fastest growing agricultural sector, with textile factories being established in the states of Puebla and Mexico. Factories produced both cotton yarn and finished textiles. With the development of a network of railway lines, commercial agriculture became more generally possible. Tobacco was an important crop, no longer protected as a colonial monopoly of the crown, and cigarette factories using machine-rolled cigarettes produced 5 million kilos in 1898.

=== 20th century - Land reform and Green Revolution ===
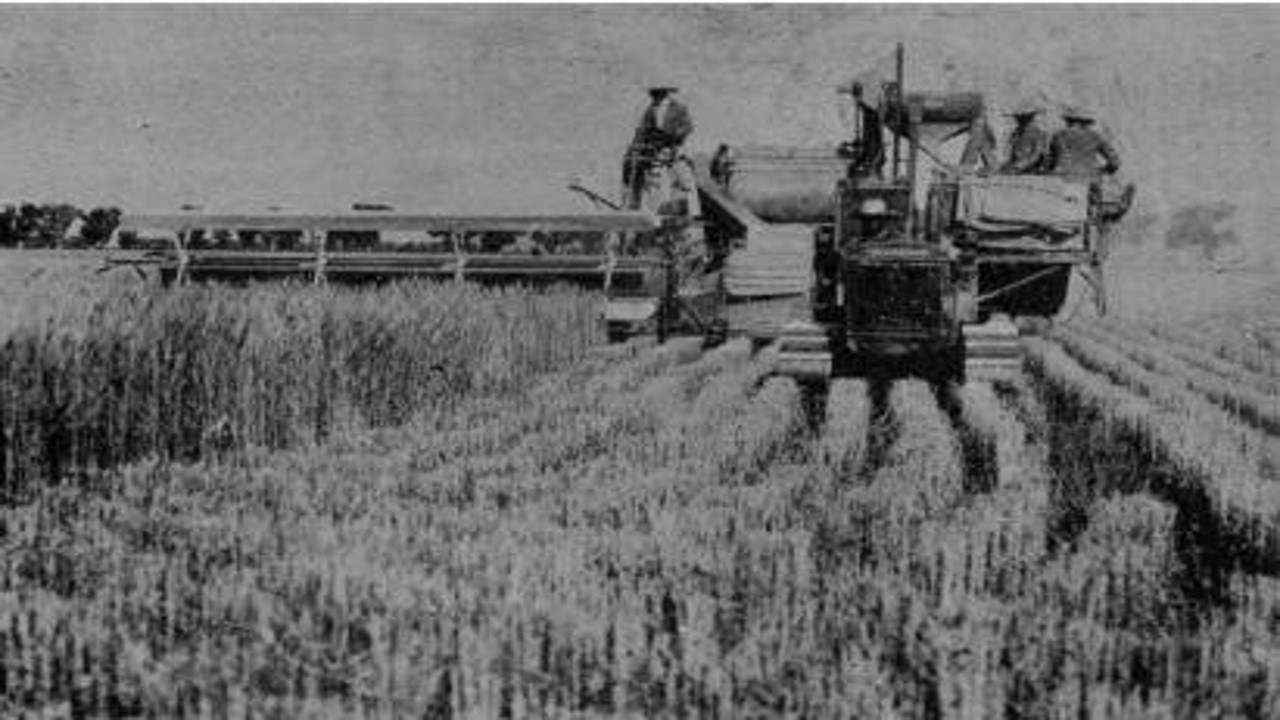
Ejido farmers working the fields following the break up of the Tlahualilo Company. The company had a large concession near the Nazas River in Durango.

The result was the Mexican Revolution from 1910 to 1920. The result afterwards was the breakup of most large private landholdings to be redistributed, especially under a system of common tenancy regulated by the government called ejidos. The lands could be worked individually or collectively by members of the ejido but the land could not be leased or sold. The process of dividing lands and developing ejido organizations continued into the 1930s under President Lázaro Cárdenas. By the end of the 1930s, haciendas almost entirely disappeared from central and southern Mexico with numerous small holdings of ten to twenty acres as well as ejidos becoming dominant. Land reform in Mexico was an achievement of the Mexican Revolution, with the distribution of land to peasants concentrated in Mexico's center and south. The breakup of the haciendas solved a political problem in Mexico, since it was one of the demands of the peasants who fought and was enshrined.

By the 1930s and 40s, agricultural production was dropping and the government sought technical solutions. Soils in central Mexico were considered exhausted by use and inadequate so that the government promoted agricultural development outside the traditional areas of cultivation, particularly in northern Mexico. In the 1940s during the presidency of Manuel Avila Camacho, the Mexican government partnered with the U.S. government, and the Rockefeller Foundation to launch the so-called Green Revolution (1950–70). Research facilities developed new strains of wheat, maize, beans, and other crops, to engineer a variety of desirable traits, such as disease resistance, high protein content. Sorghum, a new crop was introduced to Mexico during the era of the Green Revolution, which was used for animal fodder. Mexico expanded cattle production in this era, fed on sorghum. Seeds and inputs of fertilizer and pesticides for irrigated agriculture were suited to Mexico's northwest, but required more capital than small-scale cultivators could afford. Mexico's agricultural output between 1950 and 1970 was "truly spectacular," but it was not long lasting, subsequently called "the birth place and burial ground of the Green Revolution" Synthetic pesticides were applied to fields to control both insect infestations attacking plants, but also controlled insects that were disease vectors for humans. Synthetic fertilizers required adequate water so that its nitrogen would not be toxic to crops. The application of both pesticides and fertilizers were applied regularly. Pemex, Mexican national oil company, and Fertimex, the national company for the production of pesticides, particularly DDT, were integral in promoting large-scale, agribusiness dependent on these synthetic inputs. In order to be competitive, Green Revolution crops had to be cultivated and harvested by machinery, which meant that it was economically viable only with large-scale farms.

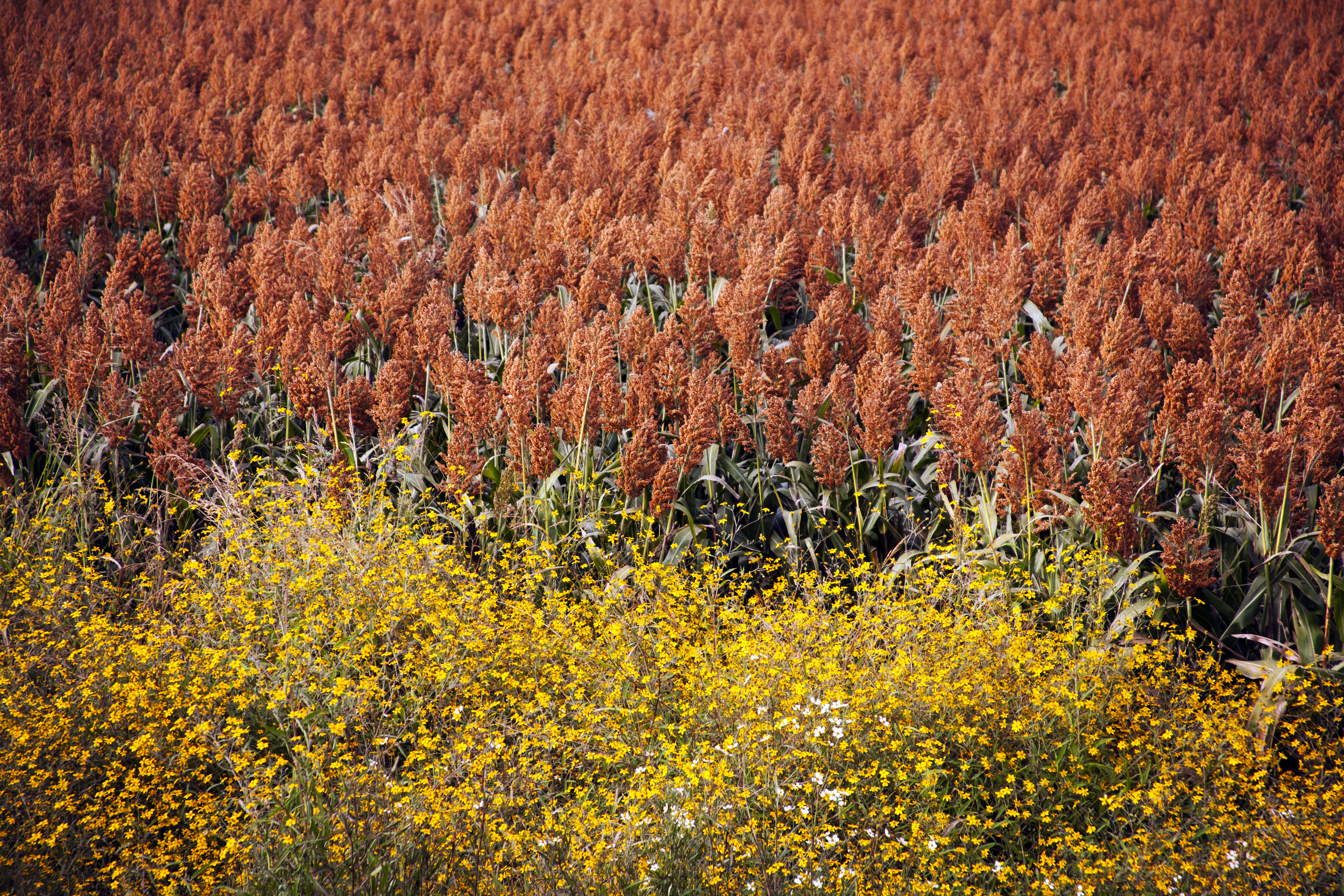
Sorghum field in Guanajuato. Sorghum is mainly used for cattle feed in Mexico.

The ejido system remained intact until the 1990s. However, during World War II, industry became the more important sector of the economy. Mexico’s rural population began to fall in the mid century, from 49.3% in 1960 to 25.4% in 2000. Federal policies outside ejidos still favored large agricultural producers over rural peasant production, including the offering of credit and protectionist policies. One of these was the construction of major irrigation systems, especially in the north. The first major irrigation project was the Laguna Project near Torreón, followed by the Las Delicias Project near Chihuahua, both with the aim of producing cotton along with wheat. These projects increased the amount of land available for agriculture from 3.7 million acres in 1950 to 8.64 million acres in 1965. In addition, the Mexican government encouraged only crops such as corn and beans, restricting imports of these two staples until 1990.

By the 1970s, agricultural production was unable to keep up with population growth leading to imports of basic staples. The Mexican government initiated programs in the 1970s and 80s to encourage family planning and the utilization of birth control, in order to reduce surging population growth. The peasant population had increased 59% in the period 1940–1960, with the number of work days in the fields going from 190 days in 1950 to 100 days in 1960. Overpopulation was a factor in internal migration as well as migration for work to the U.S.

The rise of neoliberalism and the negotiation of NAFTA in the early 1990s pushed agriculture towards even more commercialized enterprises. The Mexican constitution was modified in 1992 to allow for leasing and selling of ejido land if the majority of members voted in favor. The goal of this was to allow ejidos to combine to form larger and more efficient farms, with money invested from private sources, but has resulted in most ejido land becoming privately held.

These changes have had uneven effects on Mexican agriculture. Until the late 1990s, Mexico was a net exporter of agricultural products, but today it is a net importer, mostly from the United States. With the need to compete with imported grains and less direct support from the government, the agricultural sector entered a crisis. Mexican agricultural income has polarized with large commercial farms dominating the sector and at the other end small subsistence farming which still is the main source of income for many, especially in the south of the country. The former are able to take advantage of reduced trade barriers and exports, especially to the United States have increased. Former subsidies provided by the government was replaced by a program called Procampo, which gave direct cash payments to farmers growing corn, beans, wheat and other grains, allowing farmers to decide what to plant.

Despite greater output, agriculture continues to decrease in percentage of Mexico’s GDP since 1990. The proportion of GDP of agriculture, forestry and fishing fell from 8% of the nation’s GDP in 1990 to 5.4% of Mexico’s GDP in 2006, with a growth rate of only 1.6% during that time, far behind other sectors of the economy. In 2010, the structure of the GDP and labor force showed agriculture, forestry, and fishing combined was valued at 3.8% of total value, employing 5,903,300 or 12.5% of the labor force.

== Modern agriculture in Mexico ==
=== Agricultural trade ===
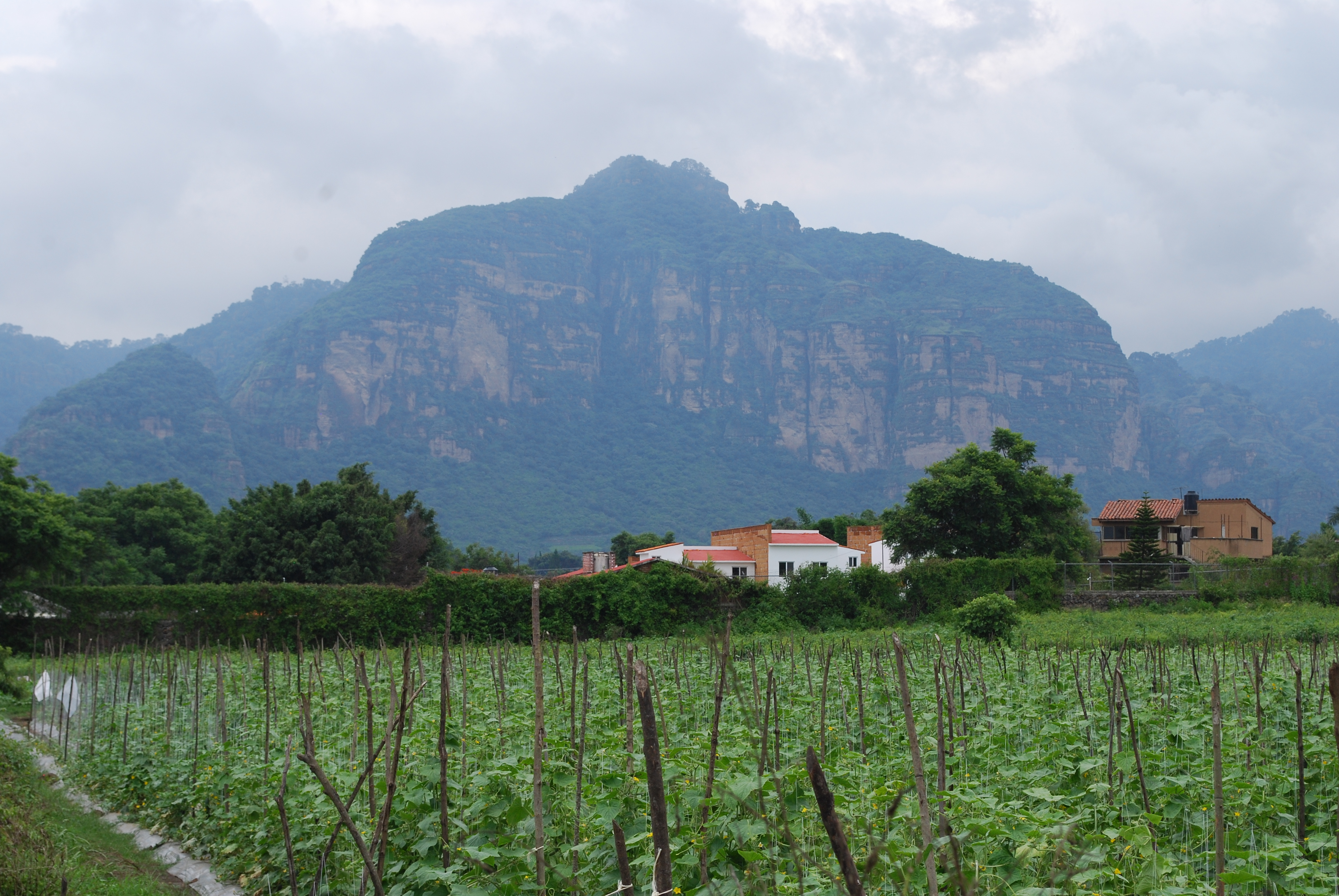
Cucumber field next to mountain in Tlayacapan, Morelos

Commercial agricultural products mostly come from three areas of the country, the tropics of the Gulf of Mexico and Chiapas Highlands, the irrigated lands of the north and northwest and the Bajío region in central Mexico. At the beginning of the 21st century Mexico’s main agricultural products include beef, fruits, vegetables, corn, milk, poultry, pork and eggs, which make up about 80% of agricultural production.

The most profitable tropical crops are coffee and sugarcane. Coffee is exported but sugarcane is mostly for domestic consumption. Other important tropical crops are fruits such as bananas, pineapples and mangos as well as cacao and rice. Vanilla is still also grown, which is native to Mexico. Cotton is an important crop in the export agricultural areas of the Soconusco in Chiapas and in the north of Mexico.

As of the early 21st century, the rural workforce is still significant but it is shrinking. Traditional farming methods with small plots worked by families and small communities still dominate in many regions especially those with large indigenous populations such as the Southern Plateau. In these areas the main crops are corn, beans and squash as in the Mesoamerican period. Many farmers still survive on subsistence agriculture earning cash by selling excess crops in local markets, especially in central and southern Mexico.

Export of agricultural products to the United States is particularly important, especially since the implementation of NAFTA. While only about twelve percent of United States agricultural exports go to Mexico, about sixty percent of Mexico agricultural exports go to the United States. Mexico’s growing population has made the country a net importer of grains. Under NAFTA, the US has an advantage in the production of corn but Mexico has the advantage in the production of vegetables, fruits and beverages. The two fastest growing exports to the US are winter fruits and vegetables as well as fruit juices and fresh flowers. Two important products for export to the United States are avocados and tomatoes. The US prohibited import of Mexican avocados for over eighty years for hygienic reasons. In 1997, began to allow import of avocados from Michoacán. Most of the imported tomatoes eaten in the United States now come from Mexico.

Significant Mexican agribusiness enterprises include Grupo Maseca, headquartered in Monterrey. It has modernized corn flour production in Mexico and is the largest corn flour producer in the United States. Pulsar International in Monterrery has a number of high-tec agribusiness concerns including Savia, which has operations in 123 countries. A number of U.S. agribusiness enterprises have significant investments in Mexico, including Campbell Soup, General Mills, Ralston Purina and Pilgrim’s Pride. The last is the second largest poultry producer in Mexico.

New grain initiatives of President Andrés Manuel López Obrador have reduced subsidies to middle and large producers with the objective of increasing smaller scale production for national consumption.

=== Geography and land tenure ===
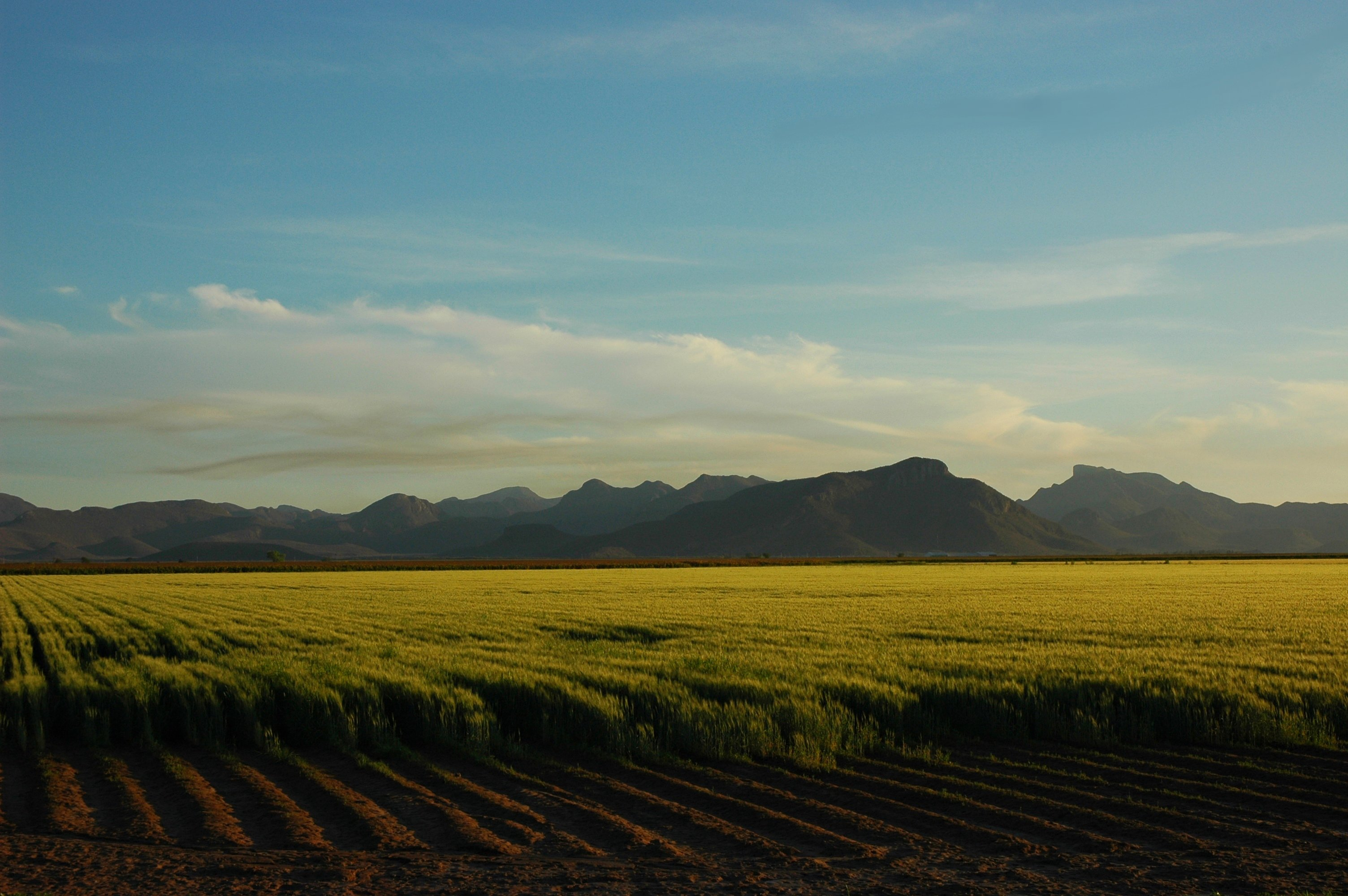
Fields in Sonora. The Green Revolution, which originated in the Yaqui Valley, and irrigation turned the arid state into a major wheat producer.

Mexico has a territory of 198 million hectares of which fifteen percent is dedicated to agricultural crops and fifty eight percent which is used for livestock production. Much of the country is too arid and/or too mountainous for crops or grazing. Forests cover 67 million hectares or thirty four percent of the country. The terrain of Mexico consists of two large plateaus (Northern and Southern), the Sierra Madre Oriental and Sierra Madre Occidental mountain chains and narrow coastal plains. These make for a wide variety of ecosystems, most of them dry due to the fact that most moisture comes from the Gulf of Mexico with the north–south mountain chains blocking much of this flow, especially in the north where it is almost entirely arid or semi arid. The wettest areas of the country are those along the Gulf of Mexico coast.

The climate and topography limits agricultural production to 20.6 million hectares or 10.5% of the nation’s territory. Twenty five percent of this land must be irrigated. About half of the territory or 98 million hectares is used for grazing including natural grassland, various scrublands, tropical forests and conifer-oak forests. About 75% of grazing land is in northern Mexico.

Sixty five percent of soils in Mexico are shallow and with low yield for crops. There are eleven main soil types in Mexico, mostly determined by climate patterns. These are the Northwest, the Gulf of California, the Central Pacific, the North, the Centre, the Northeast, the Gulf of Mexico, the Balsas-Oaxaca Valley, the South Pacific, the Southeast and the Yucatán. Those with high potential cover about twenty six percent of the country and are already heavily exploited. The greatest variety of soils is in the Centre and the Gulf of Mexico, areas with the highest population densities. It is estimated that no more than one-fifth of the territory can be made to be arable.

About one fifth of Mexico’s fields are irrigated, which is crucial for commercial production in arid north and northwest Mexico with cotton as the most important irrigated crop. Underground aquifers have been under depletion at rates higher than one meter per year in most regions, with the raising of alfalfa one reason.

Ownership of agricultural land in Mexico is either private or in some form of collective tenure, most often in an ejido arrangement. Ejidos were created in the first half of the 20th century to give Mexican peasants rights over redistributed lands, but this did not include leasing or selling. In 1992, the Mexican constitution was amended to modify this arrangement. However, most commonly held lands such as ejidos are characterized by small plots worked by families which are not efficient nor qualify for financial products such as loans.

=== Crops ===
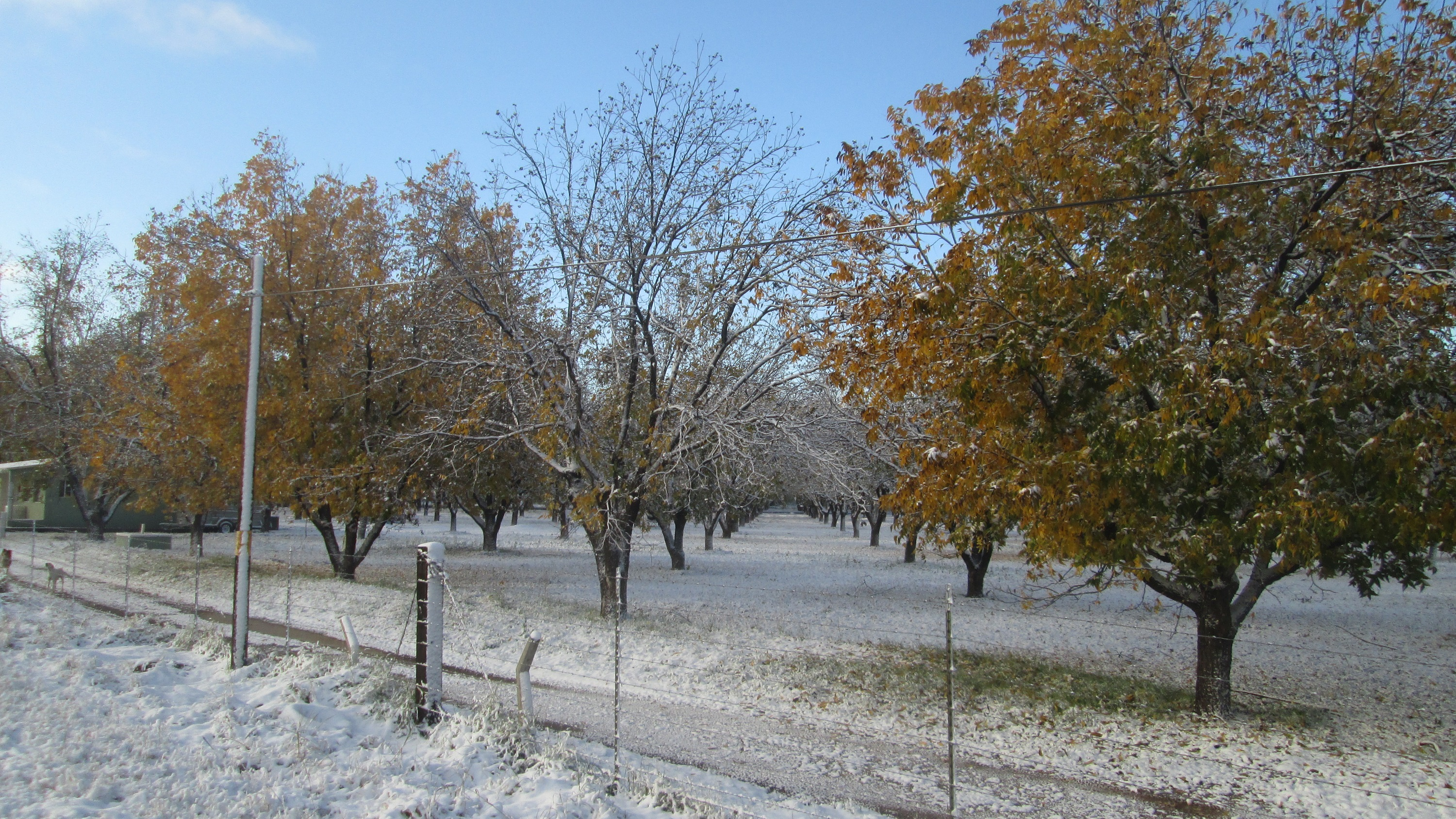
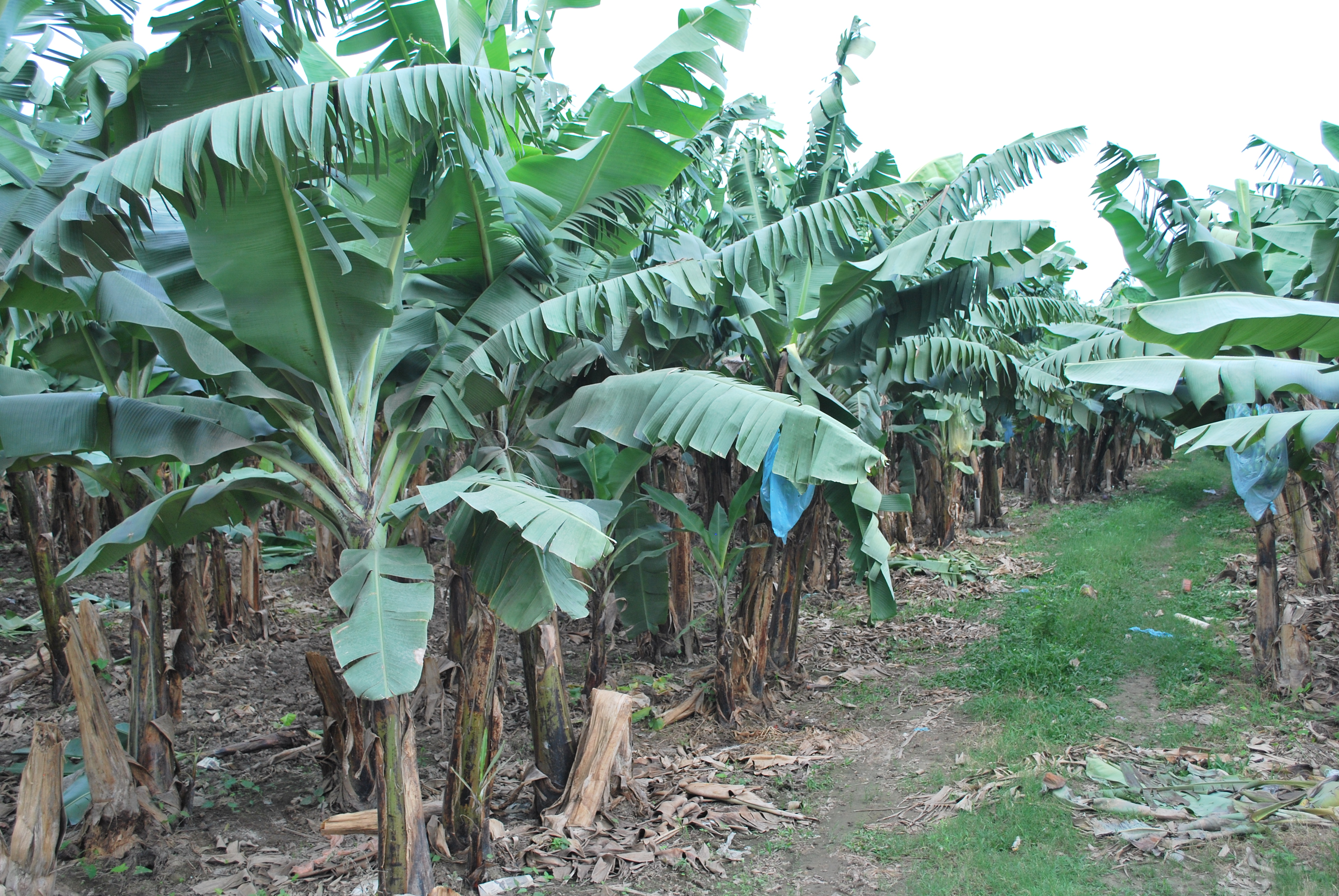
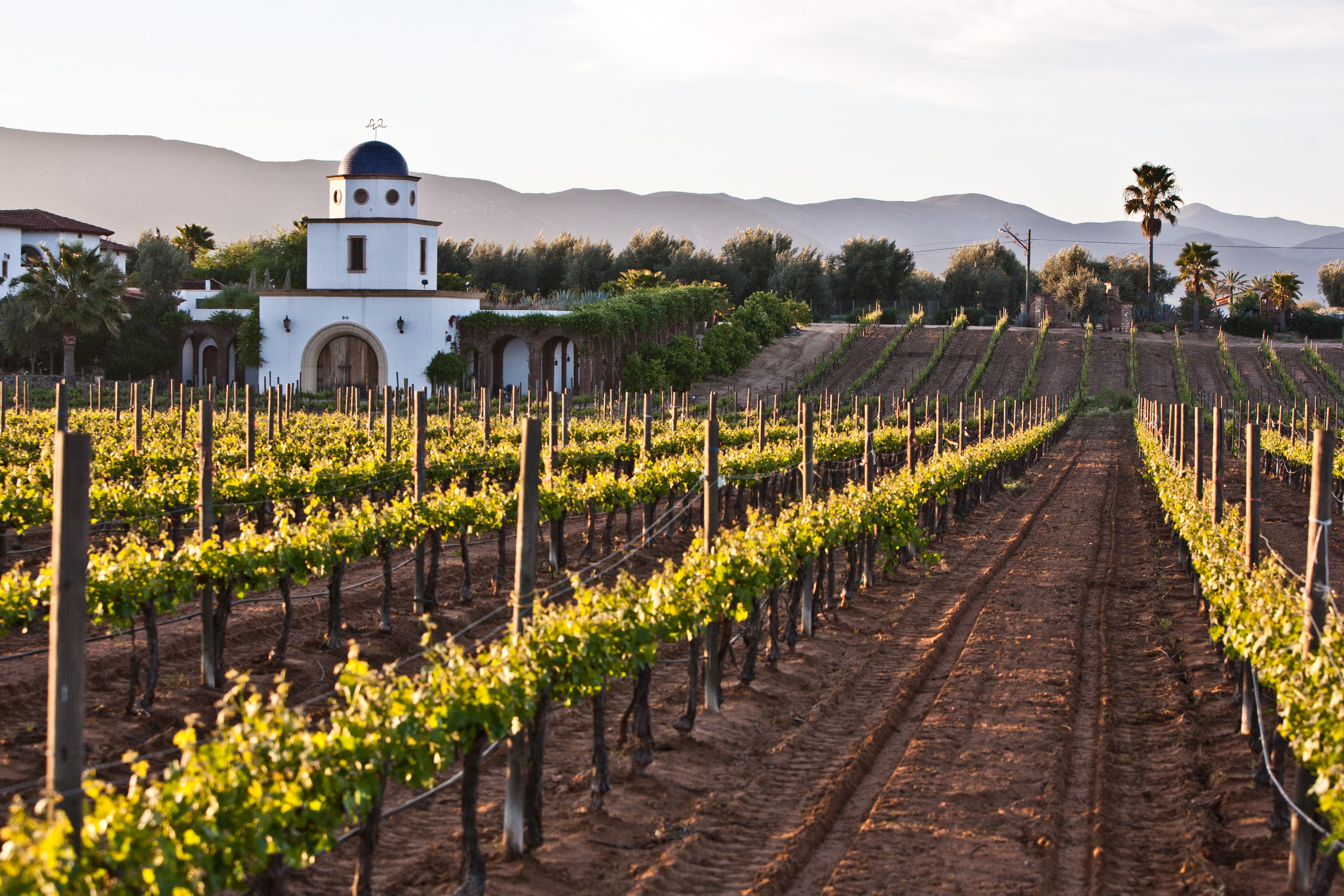
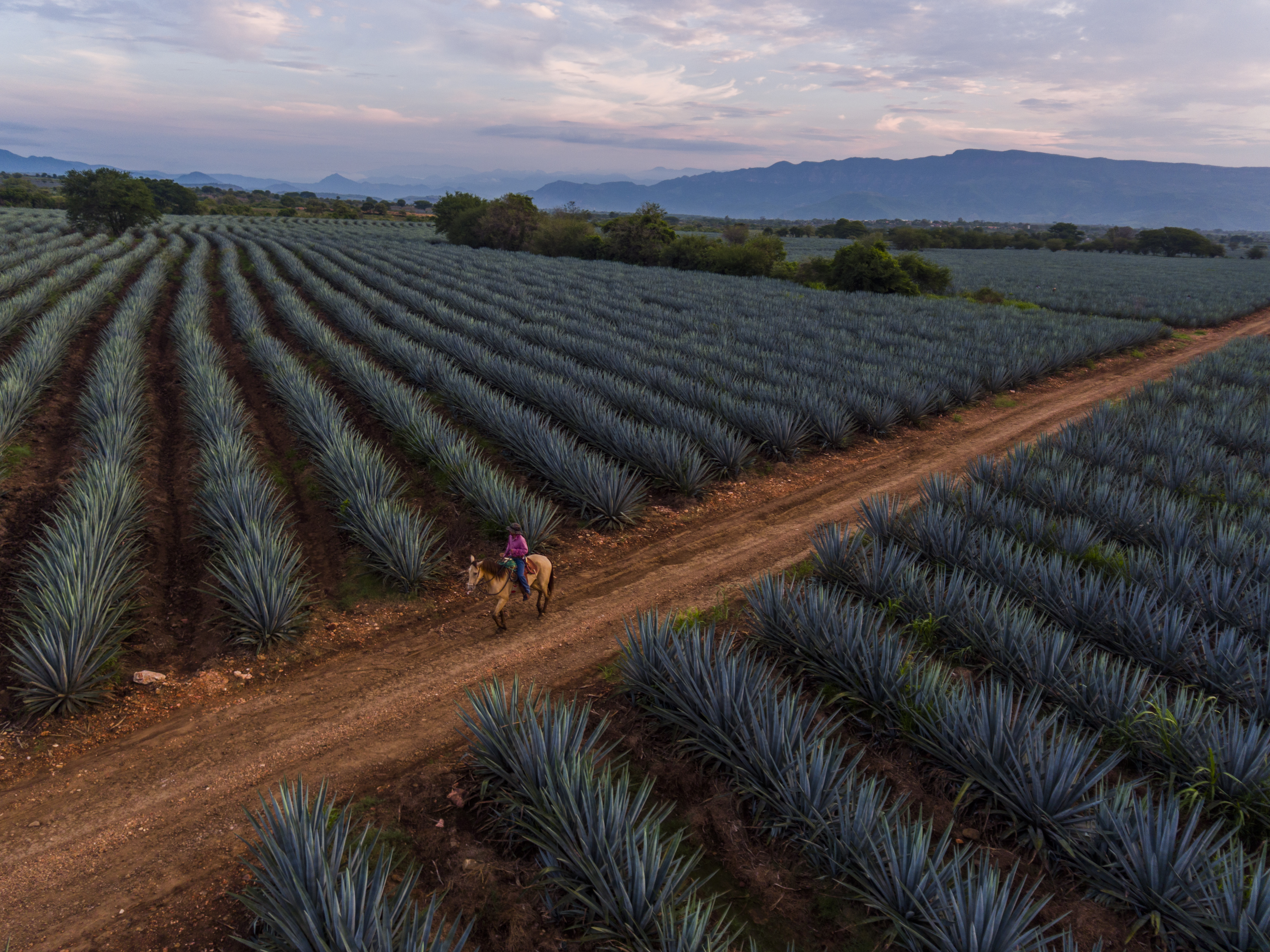
Mexico’s hyper diverse climate allows for a wide variety of crops. Here, clockwise from upper left: a pecan orchard in Camargo, Chihuahua; banana plantation in San Rafael, Veracruz; blue agave fields in Tequila, Jalisco; vineyard in Valle de Guadalupe, Baja California

The growing of crops is the most important aspect of Mexico’s agriculture, accounting for fifty percent of agricultural output. Main crops include corn, sugarcane, sorghum, wheat, tomatoes, bananas, chili peppers, oranges, lemons, limes, mangos, other tropical fruits, beans, barley, avocados, blue agave and coffee. The most important crops for national consumption are wheat, beans, corn and sorghum. The most important export crops are sugar, coffee, fruits and vegetables, most of which are exported to the United States. The most important animal feed crop is alfalfa followed by sorghum and corn.

Corn is still the most important crop in Mexico, grown on almost sixty percent of its cropland and contributing to just over nine percent of human calorie intake and fourteen percent of protein intake. Central Mexico grows about sixty percent of the country’s corn, almost exclusively in the rainy season from June to October. While self-sufficient in the production for human consumption, half of Mexico’s grain imports are for feed corn for animals.

Many of these crops are important regionally. Wheat is the most important crop in the northwest, now the center of Mexico’s grain production. Other important crops in the northwest are winter vegetables such as tomatoes and lettuce as well as oilseeds. The traditional area for grain production in Mexico was the Bajío region. The region still produces wheat, corn, vegetables, peanuts, strawberries and beans, mostly on small holdings. Wine grapes are grown in areas such as Baja California, Coahuila and Querétaro. Mexico produces two crops not generally produced elsewhere, henequen used to produce a strong fiber and maguey, both in the agave family. Maguey is used for the making of pulque as well as mezcal. Tequila is a type of mezcal made from the blue agave in a designated zone mostly in Jalisco.

The production of some important export crops, such as avocados from the state of Michoacan, have been the target of drug cartels that extort producers.

In 2018 the country produced 56.8 million tons of sugar cane (6th largest producer in the world), 27.1 million tons of maize (8th largest producer in the world), 4.7 million tons of orange (4th largest producer in the world), 4.5 million tons of tomato (9th largest producer in the world), 4.5 million tons of sorghum (6th largest producer in the world), 3.3 million tons of chili pepper (2nd largest producer in the world), 2.5 million tons of lemon (2nd largest producer in the world), 2.2 million tons of mango (5th largest producer in the world), 2.1 million tons of avocado (largest producer in the world), 1.15 million tons of coconut (6th largest producer in the world) and 1 million tons of papaya (3rd largest producer in the world). In addition to these, Mexico also produced in 2018: 2.9 million tons of wheat, 2.3 million tons of banana, 1.8 million tons of potato, 1.5 million tons of onion, 1.4 million tons of watermelon, 1.2 million tons of beans, 1 million tons of pineapple, 1 million tons of barley, 1 million tons of cucumber / pickles, 983 thousand tons of palm oil, in addition to smaller yields of other agricultural products.

=== Livestock ===
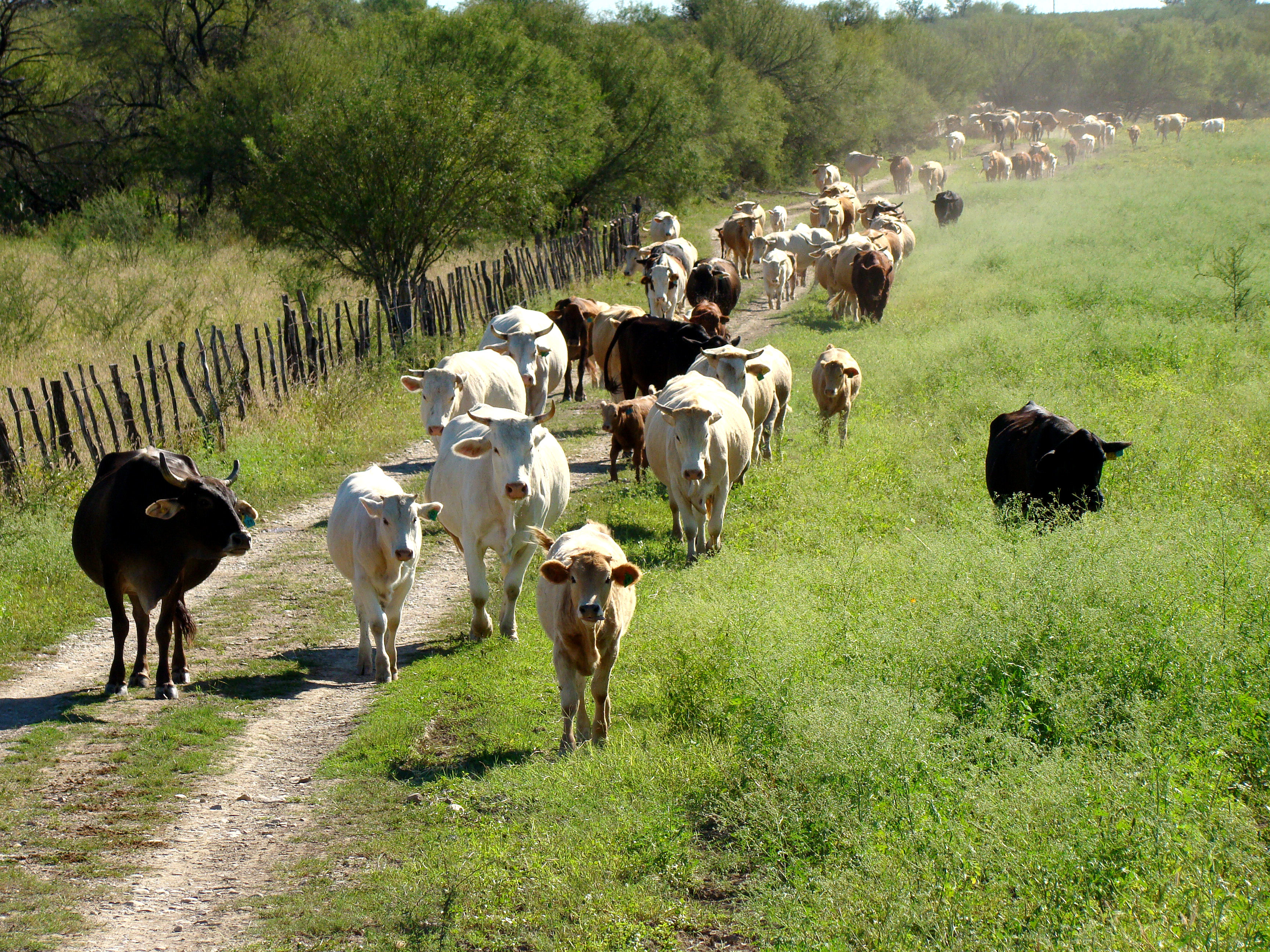
Cattle in General Terán, Nuevo León.

Livestock accounts for thirty percent of Mexico’s agricultural output, producing milk, poultry, eggs and beef. Mexico is not self-sufficient in the production of meat and fish, importing its remaining needs mainly from the United States. The north of Mexico has been the most important overall ranching area since the Mexican War of Independence. Large haciendas often exceeding 385 square miles in size were created in the 1800s and many large holdings survived the reforms associated with the Mexican Revolution. In the north open-range methods are giving way to rotational grazing systems, with some natural pastures enhanced by means of irrigation, top-seeding and fertilization.

The ruminant section has traditionally been dominated by cattle, which provide 95% of the value of ruminant products. Thirty percent are raised in the north, 26% raised in central Mexico and 44% raised in the south. European breeds for meat such as Hereford, Angus and Charolais are dominant in the north, a local breed called criollo (descendants of those brought over by the Spanish) in central Mexico and Zebu breeds dominant in the south. Dairy cattle are varieties of Holstein and criollos, 42% raised in the north, 48% in central Mexico and 10% in the south. Since the 1990s, the raising of cattle, especially for dairy, has grown, mostly in the center and north of Mexico, displacing other kinds of agricultural production.

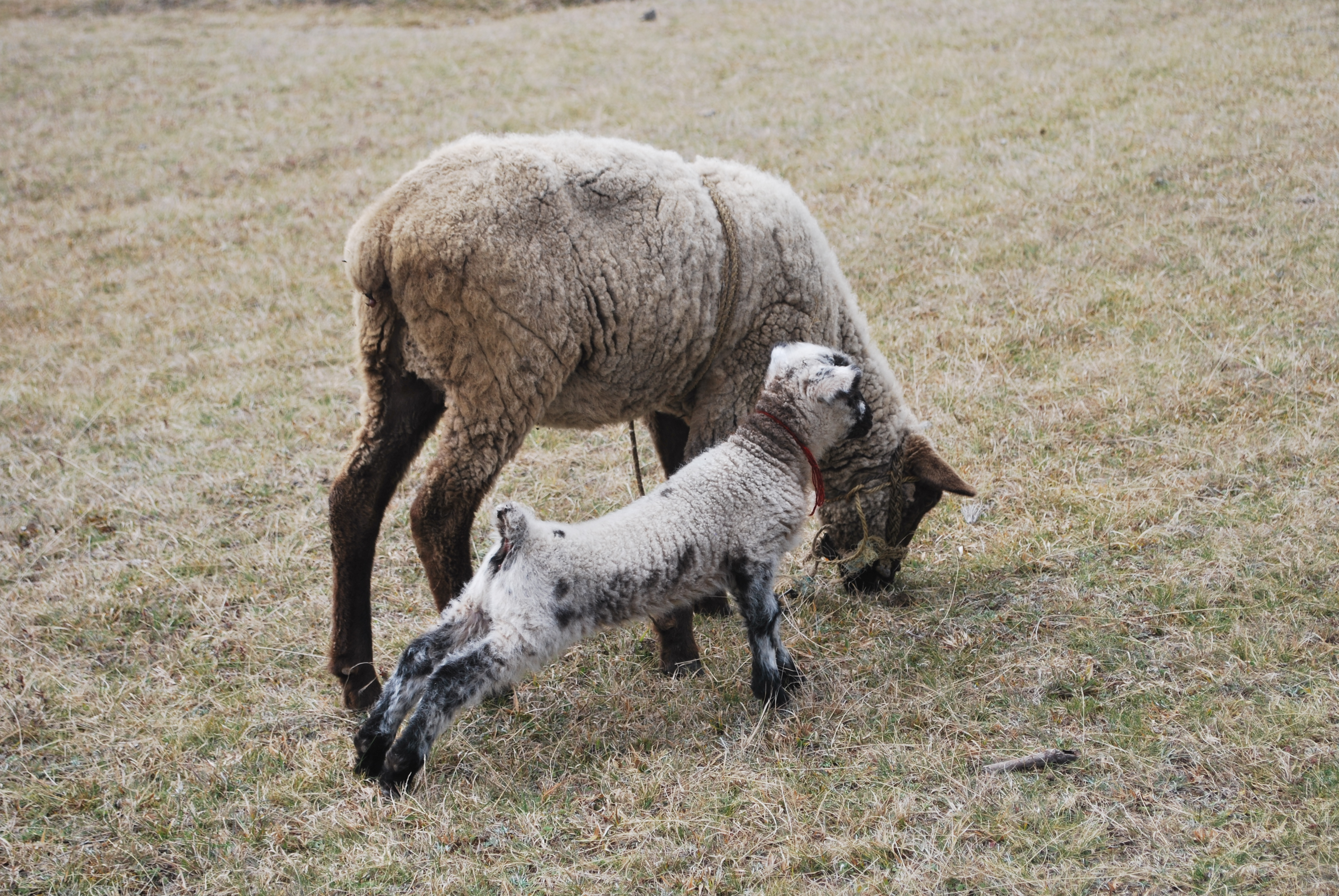
Lamb and mother in Zacatlán, Puebla.

After cows are goats, with 20% raised in the north, 58% in Central Mexico and 22% in the south. Most of these goats are criollos, descendants of those the Spanish brought with Nubian, Alpino and Saanen breeds being introduced. Seventy five percent of dairy goats are raised in Coahuila, Durango and Guanajuato. About two thirds of meat production is on eight states in various parts of Mexico. Following goats are sheep with 16% raised in the north, 60% in central Mexico and 24% in the south. Criollo and Rambouillet are dominant in the north, with Suffolk and Hampshire dominating since their introduction in the 1970s in central Mexico. In southern Mexico breeds for tropical areas such as Pelibuey, Black-belly and Katahdin increasingly dominate.

As natural pasture is not enough to support modern commercial livestock production, animal feed is produced as a crop or as a measure to enhance natural pastures. The former has increased since the 1990s and latter has increased more recently with government encouragement, especially in central and northern Mexico. In many areas, land used for the production of animal fodder, such as sorghum, is replacing that used for the growing of corn for human consumption.

== See also ==
- By commodity:
  - Avocado production in Mexico
  - Coconut production in Mexico
  - Coffee production in Mexico
  - Lime production in Mexico
  - Sorghum production in Mexico
- Economic history of Mexico
- Food security in Mexico
- Irrigation in Mexico
- Land reform in Mexico
- Latin American economy
- Sanjaya Rajaram - agronomist that helped develop 480 wheat varieties, many of which are drought resistant
- Secretariat of Agriculture, Livestock, Rural Development, Fisheries and Food
- Water resources management in Mexico
- North American Free Trade Agreement
