= Vitz =

Vitz may refer to

- Toyota Vitz, a car
- Vitz-sur-Authie, a commune in France
- Mut-vitz, a coffee cooperative in Mexico
- Vitz (surname)

== See also ==
- Witz (disambiguation)
