= Paul Hoffmann =

Paul Hoffmann may refer to:

- Paul Hoffmann (cricketer) (born 1970), Australian cricketer
- Paul Hoffmann (naval officer) (1846–1917), officer of the Imperial German Navy
- Paul Albin Hoffmann (1884–1962), German neurophysiologist known for describing Hoffmann's sign
- Paul Hoffmann (actor) (1902–1990), German actor
- Paul Hoffmann (American football), American football coach

== See also ==
- Paul Hoffman (disambiguation)
