= Sopa de lima =

Mexican soup

Lime soup
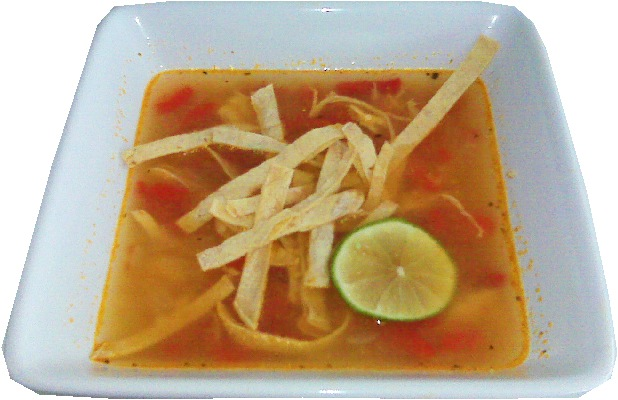
- Type: Soup
- Place of origin: Mexico
- Serving temperature: Hot

Lime soup is a traditional dish from the Mexican state of Yucatan, which is made of chicken or some other meat such as pork or beef, lime juice and served with tortilla chips.

== History ==
Lime soup is a traditional dish from Yucatan. Traditional Yucatan cuisine has its origins in the Hispanic and Yucatán Mayan culture. The combination of meat from animals brought from Europe, the spices, and cooking methods and preparation of multiple local ingredients, resulted in many dishes such as the lime soup. The lime soup as it is known was first created in 1946 by the master called Katún (means "warrior" in the Mayan language). Today it is considered one of the most representative soups of Yucatan. Since at least the 1950s, Mexico has been the world's largest producer and exporter of limes.

== Ingredients ==
The taste that characterizes this soup depends on the combination of recipes and ingredients. Its unique flavor is recognized throughout Mexico and the world by the predominance of strong seasonal ingredients. The dish is the result of the isolation from the rest of the country. The lime is not the main ingredient, although it is the one that gives the flavor to the soup.

== Taste ==
The taste of this Yucatecan soup is light, with a hint of citrus from the limes. The soup is accompanied with chicken, tomato, bell pepper, cilantro, tortilla chips and other ingredients.

== Presentation ==
Generally, lime soup is served at dinner. The soup is served in a deep plate. Tortillas are served extra, or on the side, in order to keep them crispy and prevent them from getting soggy.

== See also ==
- List of soups
