= Paul Hoffman =

Paul Hoffman may refer to:

== Sportspeople ==
- Paul Hoffman (basketball) (1925–1998), American basketball player
- Paul Hoffman (rowing) (born 1946), US Olympic rowing coxswain
- Paul Hoffman (weightlifter) (born 1955), Swazi Olympic weightlifter

== Writers ==
- Paul Hoffman (English writer) (born 1953), English novelist
- Paul Hoffman (science writer) (born 1956), American writer and television presenter
- Paul Hoffman (business writer), American business writer

== Others ==
- Paul F. Hoffman (born 1941), geologist
- Paul G. Hoffman (1891–1974), president of Studebaker and Economic Cooperation Administrator
- Paul Hoffman (engineer), IETF participant and founder of imc.org and vpnc.org
- Paul E. Hoffman, American historian, winner of the Francis Parkman Prize

== See also ==
- Paul Hoffmann (disambiguation)
