= Zapatista coffee cooperatives =

Mexican coffee workers' cooperative

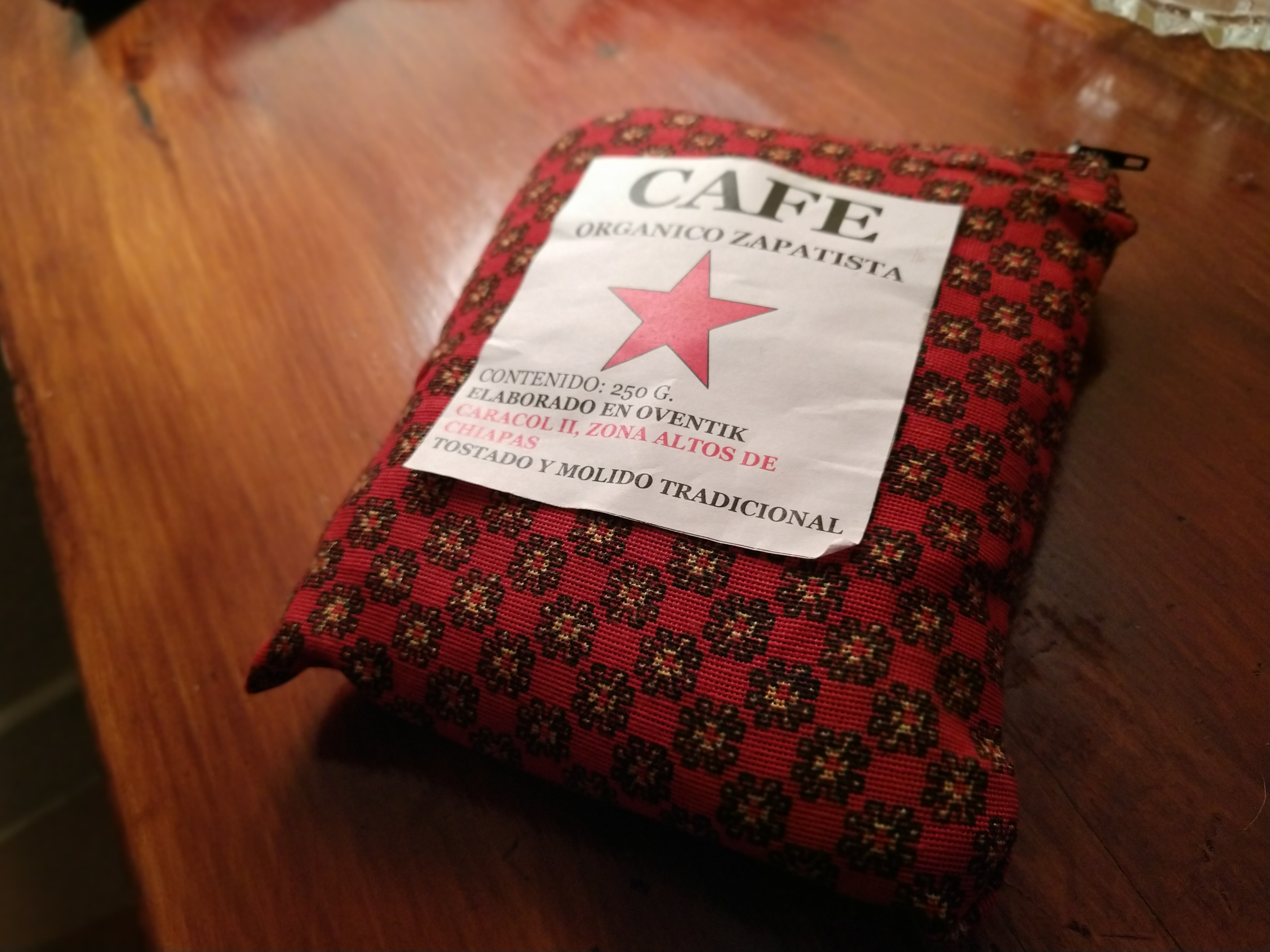
Coffee produced in a Zapatista coffee cooperative.

The Zapatista Coffee Cooperatives are a group of agricultural cooperatives which follow the Neozapatismo ideology. They primarily operate in Chiapas, the southernmost state of Mexico.

== Background ==
Mexico is a significant coffee producer (7th place worldwide). Specifically, the climatic and geomorphologic conditions in Chiapas make the state the biggest coffee producer in the whole of Mexico, constituting 25% of national coffee production.

In 1989, the protective regulations from the International Coffee Agreement were suspended. In the same period, the World Bank and the International Monetary Fund gave generous loans for the development of coffee cultivation in countries such as Vietnam that were not previously producing. This resulted in an oversupply which caused prices in the international market to collapse. The average price of Arabica coffee in the stock of raw materials of New York was, for the period 1976–1989, 3.30 dollars per kilo. For the period 1990–2005, it fell to 2.20 dollars per kilo. Also counting the loss of value of the dollar due to inflation, the producers saw the return from their product fall by more than half. Small producers, especially in Central America, faced difficulties. Their income was not enough anymore to cover the production cost, so hundreds of thousands abandoned their lands and emigrated to nearby cities or the U.S. The fall in the price impacted the broader local economy of the region, which was significantly supported through the exports of the product.

The indigenous population of Chiapas was even more affected by the crisis. They were blocked from the rest of the economic activity of Mexico, while the cultivation of coffee was their only real income. In this region, the intermediaries in 1993 were paying 8 peso (60 cents of euro) for one kilogram of coffee, while its resale price in Europe was more than ten euros. A lot of people claim that the collapse of the coffee price was the last straw for the indigenous in Chiapas. Those who didn't abandon their plantations and their families to emigrate to the USA joined the Zapatista army during their 1 January 1994 revolt.

== Organization ==
After the revolt, the demands of the revolted indigenous people for recognition of their culture and of their collective, economic and political rights, were not satisfied. Their struggle moved to the reconstruction of their autonomy from the Mexican state.

Thousands of indigenous coffee producers with experience from their previous participation in productive cooperatives were participating, who were not concerned with only finding an economic way out for their members. The first Zapatista coffee cooperative was established as a result of their experience and the new relations that EZLN created from the start with the international solidarity movement. The goal of the producers was to obtain an alternative way to supply and export of the coffee, which would allow them to end their total dependence on intermediaries and the unpredictable global market. Their call for the creation of "another" market of coffee, with more dignified conditions for the producers, was responded to quickly by small coffee shops from the U.S. with existing cooperative structures and a progressive political orientation, but also by solidarity collectives and people with no previous trading experience.

=== Mut-vitz cooperative ===
The first coffee cooperative made up exclusively of Zapatistas members was the Mut-vitz ("The Mountain of Birds") in the region San Juan de la Libertad, in the highlands of Chiapas. The Mut-vitz was established in 1997 with 200 coffee producers, which in 1999, held the first sale and export of around 35 tons to Europe and the U.S. The coffee price was set by fair trade organizations. Therefore, the producers were paid with higher prices compared to the conventional market, more than double the price that the intermediaries were giving them before this. However, the equipment of Mut-vitz was confiscated by the government of Chiapas, citing failure to pay taxes, and the co-op disbanded in 2009.

=== Yachil Xojobal Chulchan cooperative ===
Within 3 years of Mut-vitz's establishment, the amount of coffee exported increased by five times, while the number of members significantly increased, as more and more Zapatista producers entered in the cooperative. However, Mut-vitz democratically chose not to accept new members until all producers completed the transitional period of 3 years for the biological certification of coffee. As such, another cooperative known as Yachil Xojobal Chulchan ("The new light of the sky") was created in Pantelhó, in the highlands, in 2001. Its founding members were 328 producers who were Zapatistas but had not been directly accepted into Mut-vitz. In 2002, it exported its first coffee container to the "solidarity market", while the next years saw a significant increase in the amount of the coffee that was produced and the number of Zapatista producers that participated.

=== Yochin Tayel Kinal and Ssit Lequil Lum cooperatives ===
The third Zapatista coffee cooperative, which operates in Chiapas and exports coffee through the solidarity network of supply to Europe and the U.S., is the Yochin Tayel Kinal ("Starting to work the new land"), which is based in Altamirano and comes under the Junta de Buen Gobierno, Good Government Council, of Morelia. It was established in 2002 and held its first export of coffee in 2003. This cooperative used to have 800 participants, including producers from Roberto Barios zone. In 2007, after getting the necessary expertise, some members autonomously organized into a fourth cooperative, named Ssit Lequil Lum ("Fruits of Mother Earth"), which held its first export in the spring of 2008.

== Structure ==
The general assembly of the producers is the supreme body of the cooperatives, which is convened at least once a year and elects a new administrative council every 3 years. In total, there are around 2.500 producers included, while the amount of coffee that goes to the solidarity networks is hundreds of tonnes, depending the special conditions each year. They are an integral part of the Zapatista movement and they cooperate with the political structures of the movement, the Good Government Councils.

Through their operation, the producers don't depend on the local or global market. Through the collective organization and the cooperation with the solidarity networks, the producers receive a price for their product that can cover the cost of production while also bringing them a fair income which increases over the years. They also gain access to common structures and technical support. As the cooperatives develop, they contribute some of their income to the autonomous programs of education, health, and to other social structures. The initiatives and the organizations that participate in the solidarity networks of disposal return some amount of their incomes to the Zapatista communities. In this way, the coffee cooperatives operate as a driving force of the Zapatista movement.

The Zapatista coffee cooperatives consciously refuse any kind of help from the Mexican state and deal with the technical and bureaucratic processes only with the support of independent and solidarity organizations in Mexico. At the same time, they try to develop some infrastructure projects such as spaces for storage and preprocessing the coffee. The biggest obstacle is the Mexican authorities, such as a penalty for Mut Vitz in 2007 due to tax irregularities.

== Distribution in Europe ==
Zapatista coffee is distributed to at least 12 European countries from a variety of initiatives. All these local initiatives are connected through the horizontal network RedProZapa (Distribution Network of Zapatista Products), which hold central assemblies twice a year in a European city. The sale of coffee provides economic support to the productive structures in Chiapas.

== See also ==
- A Place Called Chiapas – a documentary on the Zapatistas and Subcomandante Marcos
- Chiapas conflict
- Coffee production in Mexico
- Himno Zapatista – anthem of the Zapatistas
- Indigenous movements in the Americas
- International Coffee Agreement
- Mut-vitz
- San Andrés Accords
- Union of Indigenous Communities of the Isthmus Region
- Zapatista Army of National Liberation
