= Coffee production in Mexico =

Coffee production in Mexico is the world's eighth largest with 252,000 tonnes produced in 2009, and is mainly concentrated to the south central to southern regions of the country. The coffee is mainly arabica, which grows particularly well in the coastal region of Soconusco, Chiapas, near the border of Guatemala.

At the end of the 18th century, coffee came to Mexico from the Antilles, but was not exported in great quantities until the 1870s. During the 1980s, coffee became the country's most valuable export crop. Notable beans include Altura, Liquidambar MS and Pluma Coixtepec.

== History ==
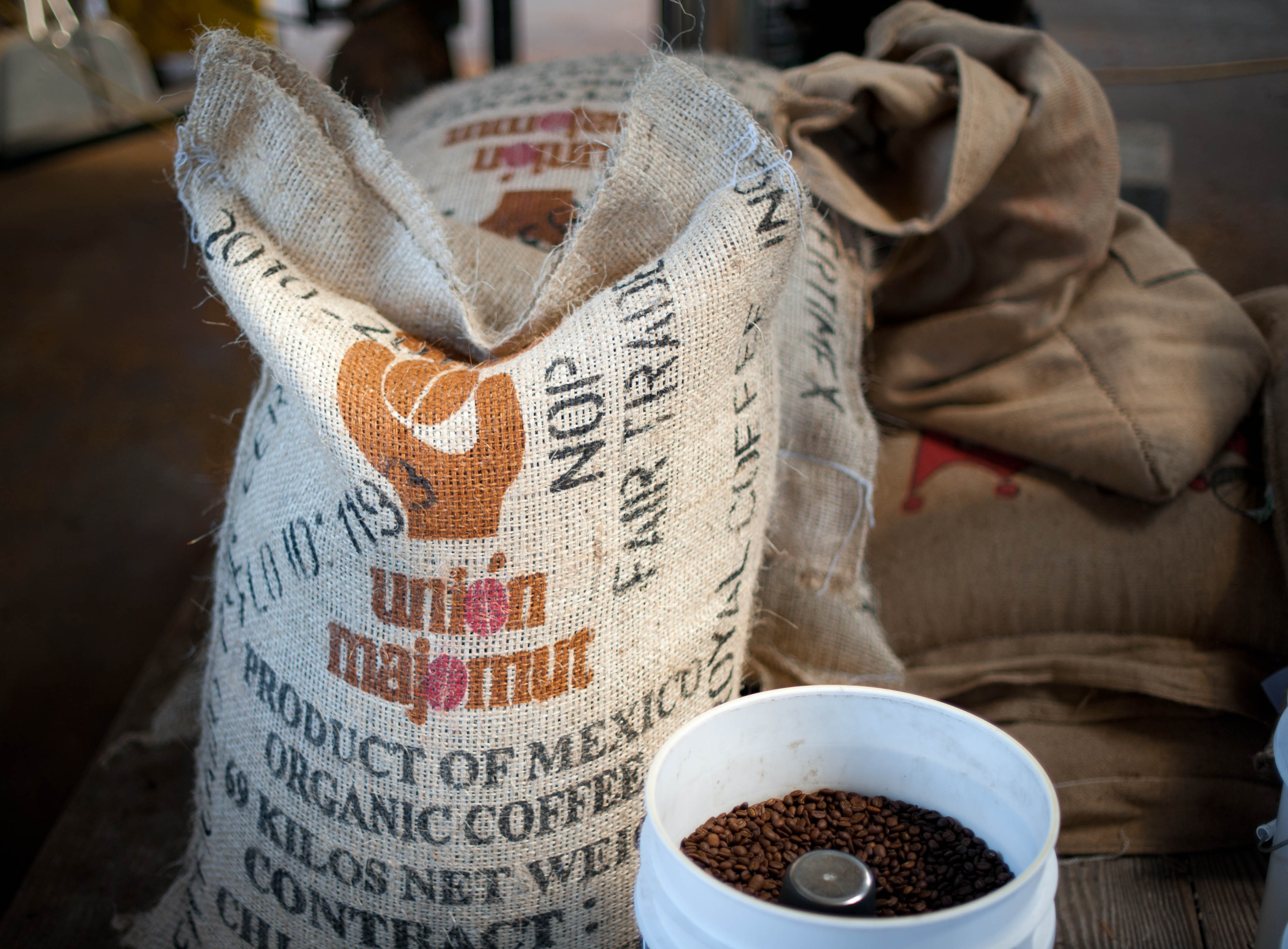
Organic coffee from Chiapas.

At the end of the 18th century, coffee was first introduced into Veracruz, a state in Mexico. In 1954, when the price of coffee peaked as it emerged in the international market, production was moved to Mexico, where it cost significantly less. Since coffee has been introduced into Chiapas at the end of the 19th century, it has become the major region of coffee cultivation in Mexico. During the early 1980s, coffee plantations in Mexico spread rapidly over 12 states.

In 1982, the total amount of land in Mexico used for coffee production was 497,456 hectares. In addition, during the 1970s and 1980s, coffee production played a significant role in the national economy and became a major source of income for more than two million people in Mexico. Coffee plantations contributed to Mexican export trade with a great amount of foreign currency. At the same time, the commercialized coffee industry offered many employment opportunities in Mexico.

== Instituto Mexicano del Cafe (INMECAFE) ==
The Mexican Coffee Institute (Instituto Mexicano del Cafe) ——INMECAFE, was a government regulated agency, responsible for providing technical assistance, administrating the Mexican export quotas of coffee, and keeping coffee price high and stable in the market. Because of the INMECAFE efforts to integrate new land into coffee cultivation, coffee productivity rapidly increased. As the result, the three main states, Chiapas, Veracruz and Oaxaca, contributed 73% of the total amount of agriculture land for coffee production.

Between 1970 and 1982, the Mexican agriculture land devoted to coffee production increased by 141,203 hectares and national coffee production has grown approximately 6,000 tons of green coffee per year. In addition, INMECAFE encouraged the use of agrochemical technologies and the organization provided technical assistance to farmers to achieve higher productivity. Respectively, 50% of coffee cultivation in Chiapas, 22% in Veracruz, and 22% in Oaxaca has accepted the technical assistance from INMECAFE. INMECAFE's technical assistance covered approximately 28% of coffee production regions in Mexico in 1982.

In 1989, INMECAFE disintegrated after president Carlos Salinas de Gortari declared that the Mexican government would give up control of its coffee market while they respond to the World Bank and other international financial institutions’ construction adjustments. This policy change left farmers without protection from the highly volatile international coffee price and had devastating effects especially for small-scale producers.

== Coffee crisis ==
The International Coffee Agreement (ICA), created in 1962, was a protocol for maintaining coffee export countries’ quotas and keeping coffee prices high and stable in the market. However, ICA was dismantled in 1989, and as a result of the deficiency in management, coffee has been overproduced while coffee prices continuously fell, and a coffee crisis emerged in Mexico. The coffee crisis intensified between 1999 and 2003 and generated huge social and economic problems in Mexico. Between 1989 and 1995, the coffee production declined by 6.6% in Mexico, the Coordination of Coffee Grower Organizations predicted that coffee producers would have lost 65% of their income since the crisis happened.

As a consequence of having lower income, 71% of coffee producers in Mexico ceased to use fertilizers, 40% of them reduced the maintenance to weeding, and 75% of them stopped investing in pest prevention. As a result of the poor maintenance on coffee plantations, the quality of coffee declined and coffee production decreased. By the end of 2005, Mexico saw its lowest exported shipment of coffee in the past three decades, totaling 1.7 million bags. During 2006, coffee export in Mexico has grown to 4.2 million bags, but it was still low, compared to 5 years earlier.

== See also ==
- Agriculture in Mexico
- Union of Indigenous Communities of the Isthmus Region
- Zapatista coffee cooperatives
- List of countries by coffee production
