= Vitz (surname) =

Vitz is a surname. Notable people with the surname include:

- Carl Vitz (1883–1981), American librarian and author
- Paul Vitz (born 1935), American psychologist
- Rico Vitz, American philosopher
