= Lions in the Street =

Book by Paul Hoffman

- Front cover
- Author: Paul Hoffman
- Language: English
- Subject: Law
- Publisher: Saturday Review Press
- Publication date: 1973
- Publication place: United States
- Media type: Hardcover
- Pages: 274
- ISBN: 0-8415-0235-8
- OCLC: 645209
- Dewey Decimal: 338.7/6134/0097471 19
- LC Class: KF297 .H6

Lions in the Street: The Inside Story of the Great Wall Street Law Firms is a 1973 book by Paul Hoffman.

== Overview ==
The book describes the great Wall Street law firms of the 1970s, prominent cases, traditions and a community of high-profile lawyers. Some famous names discussed: Cravath, Swaine & Moore; Davis Polk & Wardwell; Lord Day & Lord; Donovan, Leisure, Newton & Irvine; Cleary, Gottlieb, Steen & Hamilton; Carter, Ledyard & Milburn; Coudert Brothers; Covington & Burling, and others.

== Contents ==
1. The Congress of Vienna Sits on the Fifty-seventh Floor
2. Downtown, Midtown, All Around the World
3. The $100-an-hour Toll Collectors
4. Some Partners are more Equal than Others
5. The Care and Feeding of Corporate Clients—I
6. The Care and Feeding of Corporate Clients—II
7. "As my Lawyer, Dick Nixon, said the Other Day..."
8. The Workers Are the Means of Production
9. A Lot Goes on Behind Closed Doors
10. The Green-goods Councel as the Big Board's Cop
11. The Public Servant as Private Lawyer
12. The Private Lawyer as Public Servant
13. The Greetings of the Bar Association
14. On Different Wavelengths

== Official information ==
- Hoffman, Paul (1973). Lions in the Street: The Inside Story of the Great Wall Street Law Firms. New York: Saturday Review Press. ISBN 0-841-50235-8.
