= Rico Vitz =

American philosopher

Education
- Education: University of California, Riverside (Ph.D.) University of Utah (M.S.) California State University, Dominguez Hills (B.A.)
- Academic advisors: Don Garrett (Master's Thesis); Paul Hoffman (Dissertation)

Philosophical work
- Main interests: early modern philosophy, ethics, philosophy of religion, comparative philosophy
- Website: https://sites.google.com/site/ricovitz/

Rico Vitz is an American philosopher specializing in topics at the intersections of the history of philosophy, ethics, and philosophy of religion at Honors College at Azusa Pacific University. His work focuses on early modern philosophy, ethics, and the intersection of philosophy and religion, with particular attention to David Hume, René Descartes, and comparative philosophical traditions.

== Books ==
=== Monograph ===
- Vitz, Rico. Reforming the Art of Living: Nature, Virtue, and Religion in Descartes’s Epistemology. Springer, 2015.

=== Edited Collections ===
- (ed.) Vitz, Rico, ed. Turning East II: Contemporary Philosophers and the Ancient Christian Faith. St Vladimir's Seminary Press, 2026.
- (co-ed.) Reed, Philip A. & Vitz, Rico, eds. Hume’s Moral Philosophy and Contemporary Psychology. Routledge, 2018.
- (ed.) Vitz, Rico, ed. The Ethics of Belief: Individual and Social. Oxford University Press, 2014.
- (ed.) Vitz, Rico, ed. Turning East: Contemporary Philosophers and the Ancient Christian Faith. St Vladimir's Seminary Press, 2012.

== Selected Essays ==
=== Hume & Comparative Philosophy ===
- “Hume and Zhuāngzǐ on Mysticism and Ineffability: Mutual Insights and Collaborative Challenges,” Dao: A Journal of Comparative Philosophy (forthcoming).
- “Ritual, Tradition, and Culture: Reading Hume in Light of Classical Confucianism.” Hume Studies 49, no. 2 (2024): 315-330.
- “Enriching Humean Sympathy: Reading Hume’s Moral Philosophy in Light of African American Philosophical Thought.” Hume Studies 48, no. 2 (2023): 241-262.
- “Cultural Embeddedness and the Mestiza Ethics of Care: A Neo-Humean Response to the Problem of Moral Inclusion.” Ethical Theory and Moral Practice 24, no. 5 (2021): 1091-1107. [with Marissa Espinoza]
- “Mencius, Hume, and the Virtue of Humanity: Sources of Benevolent Moral Development.” British Journal for the History of Philosophy 28, no. 4 (2020): 693-713. [with Jeremiah Carey]
- “Hume’s Moral Philosophy and Contemporary Psychology: Future Directions.” In Hume’s Moral Philosophy and Contemporary Psychology, edited by Philip A. Reed and Rico Vitz, 334-344. Routledge, 2018.
- “Character, Culture, and Humean Virtue Ethics: Insights from Situationism and Confucianism.” In Hume’s Moral Philosophy and Contemporary Psychology, edited by Philip A. Reed and Rico Vitz, 91-114. Routledge, 2018.
- “The Nature and Functions of Sympathy in Hume’s Philosophy.” In The Oxford Handbook of David Hume, edited by Paul Russell, 312-332. Oxford University Press, 2016.
- “Contagion, Community, and Virtue in Hume’s Epistemology.” In The Ethics of Belief: Individual and Social, edited by Jon Matheson and Rico Vitz, 198-215. Oxford University Press, 2014.
- “Thomas More and the Christian ‘Superstition’: A Puzzle for Hume’s Psychology of Religious Belief.” The Modern Schoolman 88, nos. 3-4 (2011): 223–244.
- “Doxastic Virtues in Hume’s Epistemology.” Hume Studies 35, nos. 1-2 (2009): 211-29.

=== Orthodox Christianity & Philosophy of Religion ===
- “Sobornost and ‘Sympathetic Comprehension’: St. Maria of Paris, Anna Julia Cooper, and Christ’s Second Love Command.” Paideia Review 1 (2025).
- “Moral Strangers as Co-Laborers in the Fields of Justice.” In A New Theist Response to the New Atheists, edited by Joshua Rasmussen and Kevin Vallier, 153-167. Routledge, 2020.
- “Orthodoxy, Philosophy, and Ethics.” In Theology and Philosophy in Eastern Orthodoxy, edited by Christoph Schneider. Pickwick, 2019.
- “‘What is a Merciful Heart?’ Affective-Motivational Aspects of the Second Love Command.” Faith and Philosophy 34, no. 3 (2017): 298-320.
- “The Divine Energies and the ‘End of Human Life’.” American Catholic Philosophical Quarterly 91, no. 3 (2017): 473-489. [with Marissa Espinoza]
- “Minding the ‘Unbridgeable Gap’: The Future of Conscientious Objection in a Secular Age.” Christian Bioethics 23, no. 2 (2017): 149-168. [with Alain León]
- “Natural Law among Moral Strangers.” Christian Bioethics 20, no. 2 (2014): 283-300. [with Boaz Goss]
