= Paul Hoffman (business writer) =

American business writer

Paul Hoffman is an American business writer. He was born in Chicago and holds A.B. and A.M. degrees from the University of Chicago. As a reporter for New York Post, he covered the New York courts for several years. His articles were also published in The New York Times, Saturday Review, Time, The Nation, and other periodicals.

== Bibliography ==
- Hoffman, Paul (1984). The Dealmakers: Inside the World of Investment Banking. Garden City, NY: Doubleday. ISBN 0-385-18287-2.
- Hoffman, Paul (1982). Lions of the Eighties: The Inside Story of the Powerhouse Law Firms. Garden City, NY: Doubleday. ISBN 0-385-17405-5.
- Hoffman, Paul (1974). What the Hell Is Justice?: The Life and Trials of a Criminal Lawyer. Chicago: Playboy Press. ISBN 0-872-23409-6.
- Hoffman, Paul (1973). Lions in the Street: The Inside Story of the Great Wall Street Law Firms. New York: Saturday Review Press. ISBN 0-841-50235-8.
