= Sorghum production in Mexico =

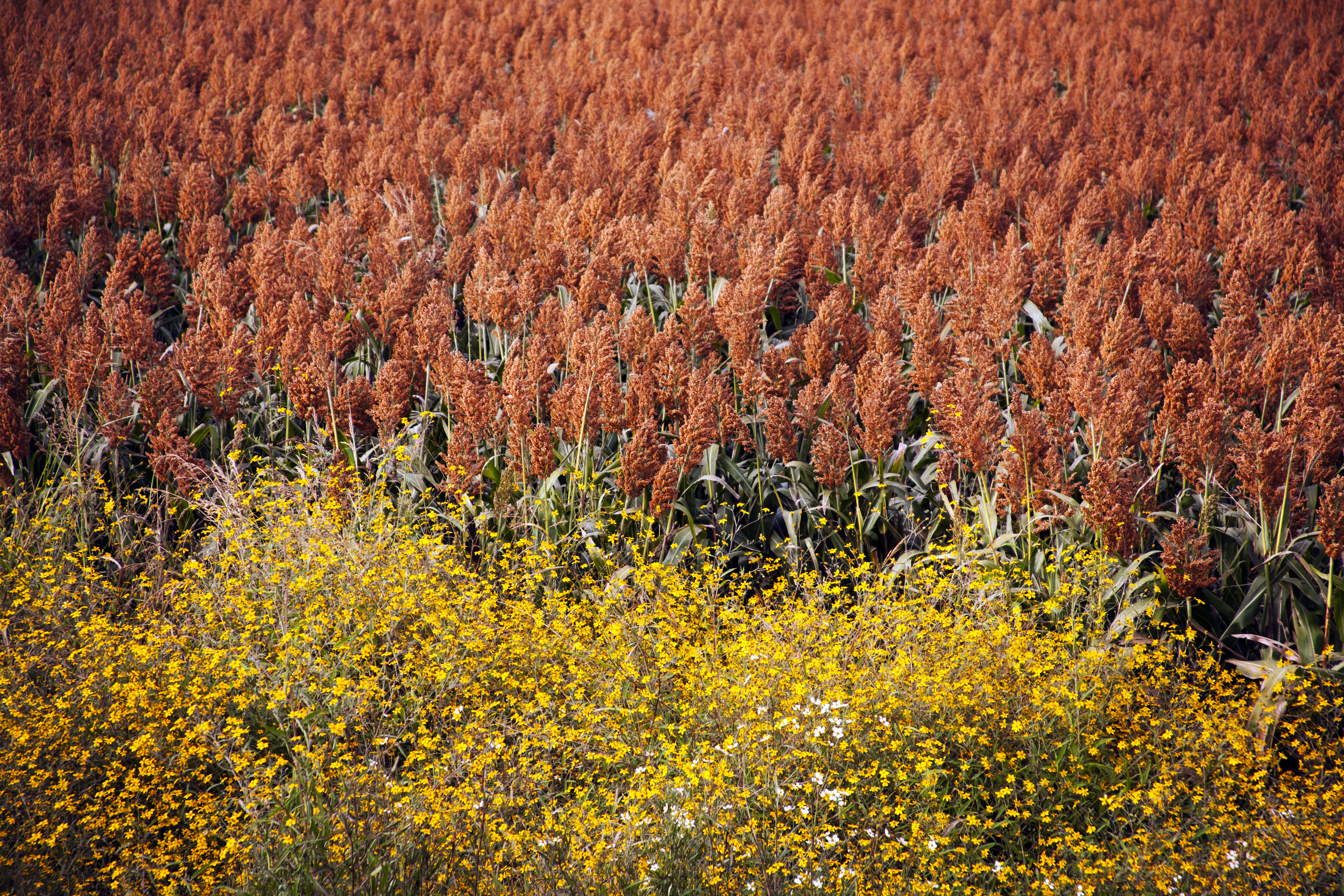
A sorghum field in Guanajuato.

Sorghum production in Mexico was established in the second half of the twentieth century, with sorghum primarily being used in the country as animal feed. The crop grew rapidly between its introduction in the late 1950s and 1980, making the country one of the world's largest producers of sorghum. However, Mexico remains a major importer of sorghum, mainly from the United States.

== History ==
Prior to the second half of the twentieth century, sorghum was virtually unknown to Mexican agriculture at least in terms of systemic cultivation. In 1944, experiments started to develop sorghum production in drought-prone regions where maize cultivation was marginal. It was not initially successful, and did not attract much attention. It was only in the late 1950s when interest re-emerged in sorghum as a feed crop due to Mexico's expanding pork and poultry industries, with the Mexican government beginning statistical records of sorghum in 1958. Between 1965 and 1982, land under sorghum cultivation grew an average of nine percent annually, reaching 1.5 million hectares by 1984. Much of this growth was attributed to the introduction of hybrid sorghum seeds, which had been developed in 1955 in the United States. Despite this expansion in production, Mexico's consumption increased even further, requiring the country to import around one-third of its sorghum from the United States in 1983–84.

== Production ==
According to the United States Department of Agriculture, Mexico produced 3.8 million tonnes of sorghum in the 2025–26 season, making it the world's sixth-largest producer. This was a notable decline from a peak production in 2018, when Mexico produced 96 percent of its domestic needs of sorghum. Throughout its history, sorghum production was supported by increased demand for animal feed, along with reductions in government subsidies for competing crops such as maize and wheat. While sorghum was initially intended for marginal agricultural areas, by the 1980s around 35 percent of sorghum were grown on irrigated land.

The state of Tamaulipas, especially its northern regions, is the largest producer with around 1 million hectares of land under sorghum cultivation (mostly rain-fed fields) in 2021. Tamaulipas produced around half of Mexico's national sorghum production. There has been a drive in the state to develop a biofuel industry based around sorghum. Other major sorghum-producing states include Sinaloa and Guanajuato.

=== International trade ===
The country briefly liberalized sorghum trade in 1989, removing import license requirements and tariffs on US sorghum, but quickly backtracked following a bumper harvest in June 1990. Due to NAFTA, US sorghum could freely be imported into the Mexican market.

In 2025, Mexico signed a health protocol agreement with China for sorghum, which allowed the entry of Mexican sorghum exports to the Chinese market. The Mexican government claimed that exports to China would reach 50 to 100 thousand tonnes within the first year.
