= Paul Hoffmann (American football) =

American football coach

Playing career
- 1977–1980: William & Mary
- Position: Offensive tackle

Coaching career (HC unless noted)
- 1987: Apprentice (DC)
- 1990–1997: Apprentice
- 2002–2007: Apprentice (assistant)
- 2008–2009: Apprentice (ST)
- 2012–2013: Apprentice

Head coaching record
- Overall: 34–56–1

Paul Hoffmann is an American football coach. He was the 30th head football coach at the Apprentice School in Newport News, Virginia and he held that position for eight seasons, from 1990 until 1997. He was inducted into the school's Hall of Fame in 2024.
