= Coconut production in Mexico =

Coconut production contributes to the national economy of Mexico. According to figures published in December 2009 by the Food and Agriculture Organization of the United Nations, it is the world's seventh largest producer of coconuts, producing 1,246,400 tonnes in 2009.
