= Mut-vitz =

Coffee cooperative in Mexico

Mut-vitz was a fair trade certified coffee cooperative in the Mut-vitz, Zapatista area in Chiapas, in the south of Mexico.

It was founded in 1997, and forcibly dissolved by the Government of Chiapas in 2009, and was located in San Juan de la Libertad (current municipality of El Bosque, Chiapas).

== History ==
In 1997, around 200 producers founded Mut-vitz, taking the name of a mountain near the cooperative.

In 1998, they received the CertiMex certificate and the license to export. The cooperative already had 750 members.

Over the years, through coffee production and commercialisation via cooperative networks, Mut-vitz became a profitable activity and demonstrated the project's viability without subsidies, protectionism, or government programs. Zapatista coffee produced by Mut-vitz was sold in Germany, the United States, France, and Switzerland, among other countries. Entry into fair trade and solidarity economy markets led to improved incomes for its members.

In 2004, Mut-vitz had 643 coffee farmers.

The company forcibly dissolved by the Government of Chiapas in 2009.

== See also ==
- Zapatista coffee cooperatives
