= Lime production in Mexico =

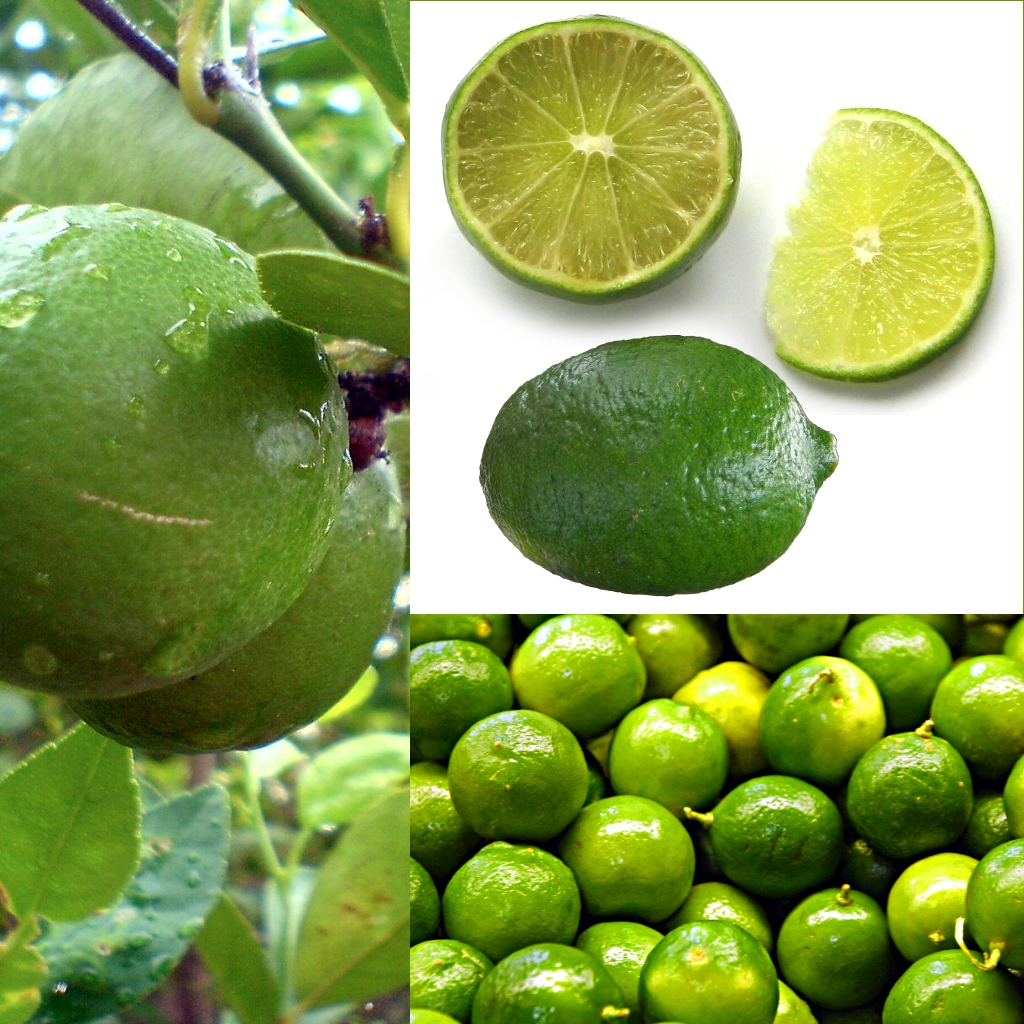
Mexican limes

For several decades, since at least the 1950s, Mexico has been the world's largest producer and exporter of limes, and especially of lime oil.

The two popular varieties of limes grown in Mexico are the Mexican or Key lime (Citrus aurantifolia) and the Persian lime (Citrus latifolia, simply called "lime" in the US); the former is of Indo–Malayan origin introduced in Mexico by the Spaniards after 1520, while the latter, also called the Tahiti lime, was introduced from the United States. Persian lime production in Mexico caters specifically to the US market; a substantial increase in production has been attributed to the North American Free Trade Agreement (NAFTA). Lime production in Mexico has also expanded consequent to the increase in its per capita consumption in the United States and the European Union (EU).

== Geographical distribution ==
Most limes are grown in the warmer southwest (60% of total) and southeast of the country (40%). Key limes amount to about 54% of the total lime production, and are grown in the southwest states of Jalisco, Colima, Michoacán, Guerrero, and Oaxaca. Persian limes, about 42% of the lime production, are grown in Jalisco, Colima, Hidalgo, in microclimates in northern Veracruz, and in the southeastern states of Tlaxcala, Chiapas, Tabasco and the Yucatan. The most important lime producing states are Michoacán and Colima.

== Characteristics of limes grown in Mexico ==
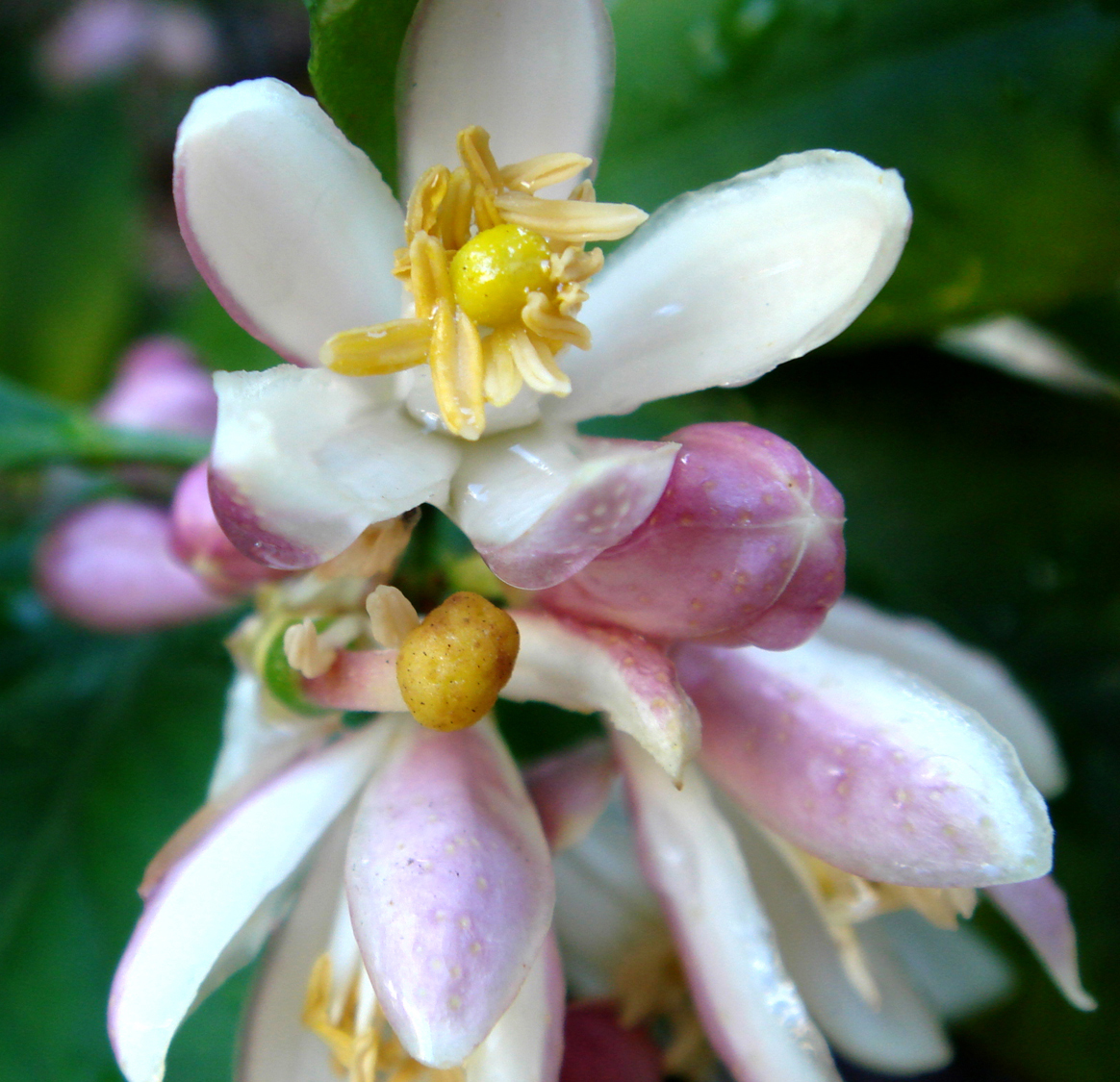
Key lime flower

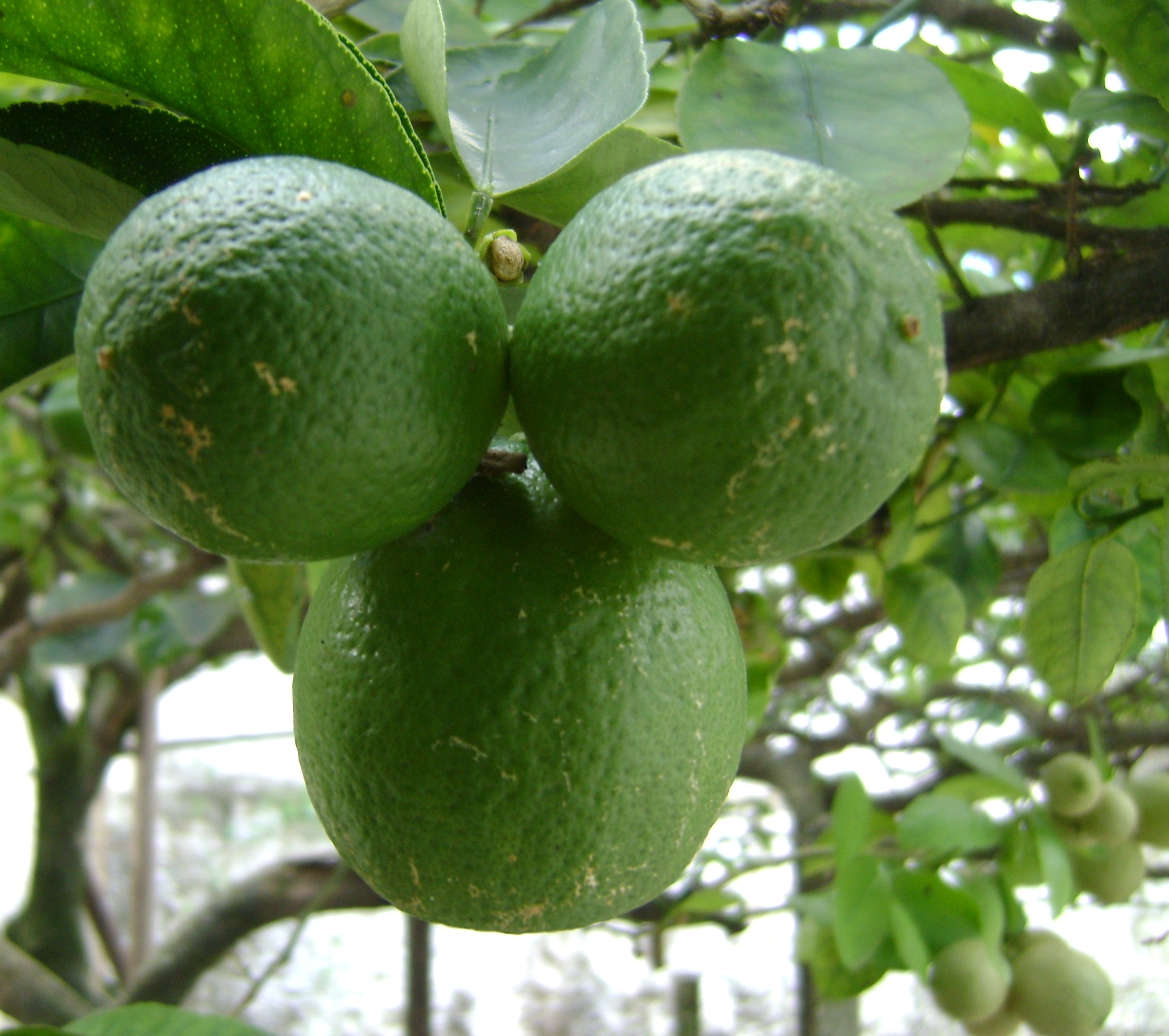
A cluster of Key limes

=== Key lime ===
The Key lime tree (also referred to in the vernacular as the “Mexican lime”) is a slender tree which grows to heights of 2.0–4.0 m (6.6–13.1 ft), bears scentless flowers (with white stems and yellow anthers) that mature into fruits, singly, in pairs or in larger clusters. The fruit, which is generally 25–51 mm (0.98–2.01 in) in diameter, as it ripens, changes its peel color from green to pale-yellow. The greenish-yellow pulp of the fruit, with its inseparable 6–15 segments, is juicy and highly acidic with flavor and aroma. It has either a few or many small seeds. Though the climatic conditions under which the Key lime thrives is moist, with annual precipitation in the range of 2,000–3,800 mm (79–150 in) the tree is more capable of enduring drought conditions than other citrus fruit varieties. However, in excessive rainfall, trees may be infected with fungus. The Key lime is also more sensitive to cold than the lemon, and can be grown only in protected locations.

The Key lime has a longer shelf life than other limes, useful since refrigeration facilities are lacking in the country. The tree species of Indo-Malayan origin was introduced to Mexico by Spanish Conquistadors after 1520. Now, 2,000,000 seedling trees are reported near Colima. However, there are very few varieties of the Key lime, except for several spineless selections, inasmuch as there is no great variation in the wild or under cultivation.

=== Persian lime ===
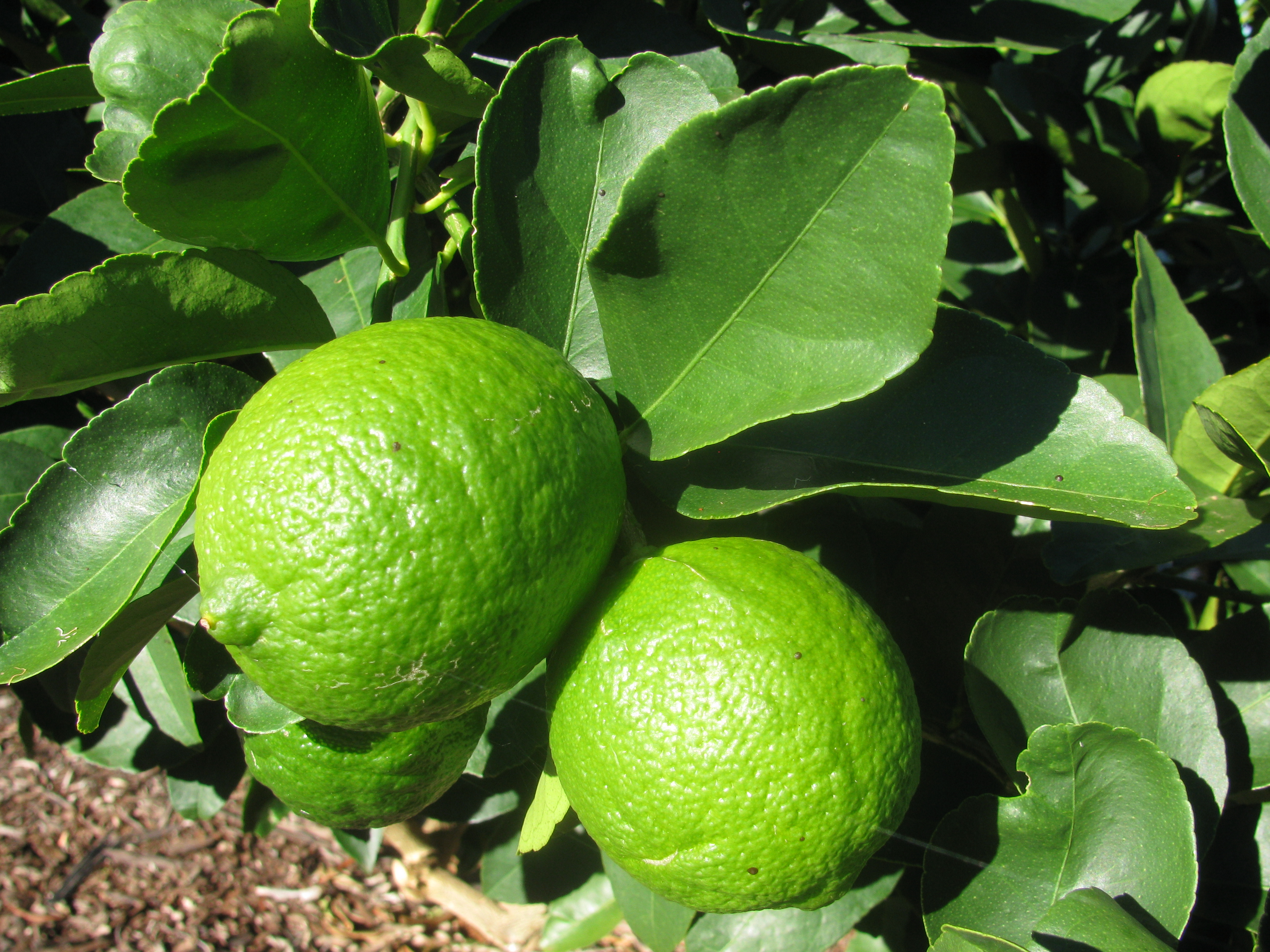
Persian lime (Citrus latifolia)

Persian limes are larger and contain more juice than Key limes. It is an acid lime which has been developed in recent times. Its origin is inferred as a hybrid of the Key lime and citron.

The Persian or Tahiti lime tree grows to 15–20 feet (4.6–6.1 m) height, with broad lanceolate leaves and slightly purple-tinged flowers (with no viable pollen) mostly in January. The fruit has vivid green peel till it ripens to pale-yellow. Its pulp with 10 segments of light greenish-yellow color is normally seedless.

== Production statistics and organized crime ==
The biggest focus of Mexican citrus production is on Key limes; in 2003, Mexico produced 768,000 tons of Key limes and 235,000 tons of Persian limes. For the 2010/11 season, Mexico forecasts that it will produce a total of 1.9 million tons of limes. The largest importers of lime oil are the US, UK, Japan, Ireland and Belgium.

In recent years, the Persian lime industry has taken off in Veracruz, dominated by large-scale producers, with over 25% of limes being produced using microjet irrigation or other irrigation systems, year-round in microclimates. Transportation costs from Veracruz to the US border are reported to be approximately 11,500 pesos (US$912.69) per trailer, depending on fuel prices.

In 2014, production problems resulted in unusually high lime prices in the United States and substitution of cheaper lemons for some uses. These were caused by bad weather, citrus greening disease, and the organized crime activities of the Knights Templar Cartel, which extorted producers and seized shipments and farms. In 2019, the Jalisco New Generation Cartel seized lime farms in Michoacán and then abandoned them a few months later. The economic aftereffects of this disruption, along with cold weather, contributed to another price spike in 2022.
