= Glenea fasciata =

Scientific classification
- Kingdom: Animalia
- Phylum: Arthropoda
- Clade: Pancrustacea
- Class: Insecta
- Order: Coleoptera
- Suborder: Polyphaga
- Infraorder: Cucujiformia
- Family: Cerambycidae
- Genus: Glenea
- Species: G. fasciata

Binomial name
- Glenea fasciata (Fabricius, 1781)

Synonyms
- Cerambyx (Stenocorus) africanus Gmelin, 1790 nec Voet, 1778; Stenocorus fasciatus Fabricius, 1781

Species of beetle

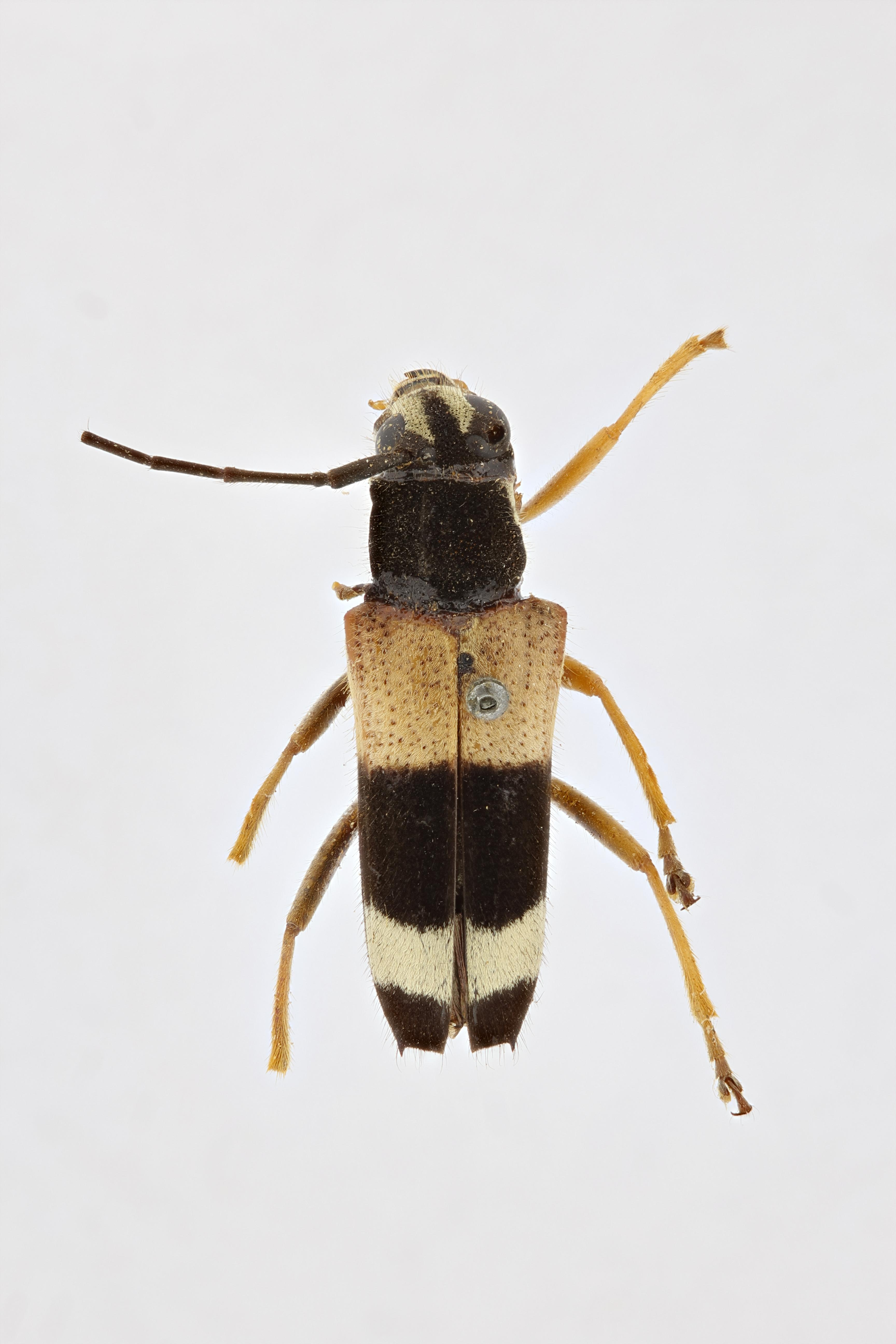
Glenea fasciata specimen

Glenea fasciata is a species of beetle in the family Cerambycidae. It was described by Johan Christian Fabricius in 1781. It has a wide distribution in Africa. It feeds on Coffea canephora and Theobroma cacao. It contains the varietas Glenea fasciata var. calabarica.
