= Lecithocera schoutedeniella =

Scientific classification
- Domain: Eukaryota
- Kingdom: Animalia
- Phylum: Arthropoda
- Class: Insecta
- Order: Lepidoptera
- Family: Lecithoceridae
- Genus: Lecithocera
- Species: L. schoutedeniella

Binomial name
- Lecithocera schoutedeniella Ghesquière, 1940

Species of moth in genus Lecithocera

Lecithocera schoutedeniella is a moth in the family Lecithoceridae. It was described by Jean Ghesquière in 1940. It is found in Cameroon, the Democratic Republic of the Congo (the former Orientale Province), Ghana and Ivory Coast.

The larvae have been recorded feeding on Coffea robusta, a species of coffee.
