= Excelsa =

Excelsa may refer to:

- Coffea excelsa, a synonym for the coffee plant Coffea liberica
- Excelsa Film, a subsidiary of Minerva Film, Italian film company 1912–1956

== See also ==
- Exelsa, a fictional character in La familia P. Luche
