= Coffea dewevrei =

Scientific classification
- Kingdom: Plantae
- Clade: Embryophytes
- Clade: Tracheophytes
- Clade: Spermatophytes
- Clade: Angiosperms
- Clade: Eudicots
- Clade: Asterids
- Order: Gentianales
- Family: Rubiaceae
- Genus: Coffea
- Species: C. dewevrei

Binomial name
- Coffea dewevrei De Wild. & T.Durand

Synonyms
- Coffea arnoldiana De Wild.; Coffea aruwimiensis De Wild.; Coffea liberica var. dewevrei; C. dybowskii, C. excelsa and others

Species of coffee plant

Coffea dewevrei is an African plant bush species in the coffee genus (family Rubiaceae); it is native to S.E. Cameroon to South Sudan and N. & W. Uganda. It is a shrub or tree and grows primarily in the wet tropical biome.

This species, together with its synonyms C. dybowskii and C. excelsa ("excelsa coffee") were formerly (2006) placed together with Coffea liberica (as var. dewevrei). However, recent genomic data analyses supports the division of C. liberica into a separate species.
