= C. affinis =

C. affinis may refer to:

- Chomatodus affinis, a prehistoric fish
- Coffea affinis, a type of coffee
