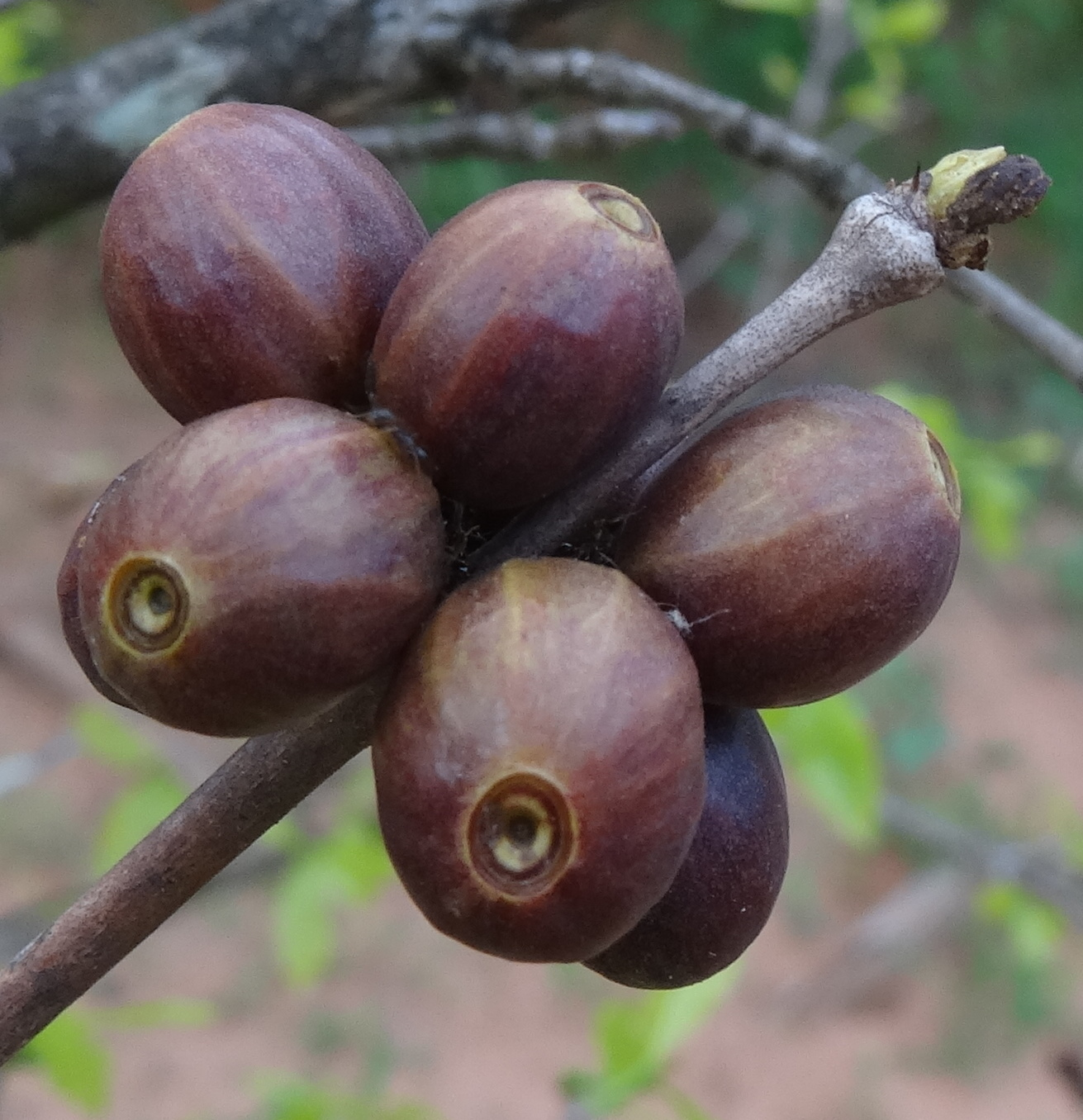
- Coffea racemosa berries

Conservation status
- Near Threatened (IUCN 3.1)

Scientific classification
- Kingdom: Plantae
- Clade: Embryophytes
- Clade: Tracheophytes
- Clade: Angiosperms
- Clade: Eudicots
- Clade: Asterids
- Order: Gentianales
- Family: Rubiaceae
- Genus: Coffea
- Species: C. racemosa

Binomial name
- Coffea racemosa Lour. (1790)

Synonyms
- Coffea ramosa J. J. Roemer & J. A. Schultes (1819); Coffea mozambicana DC. (1830); Coffea swynnertonii S. Moore (1911)

= Coffea racemosa =

Species of coffee plant

Coffea racemosa, also known as racemosa coffee and Inhambane coffee, is a species of flowering plant in the family Rubiaceae. It has naturally low levels of caffeine, less than half of that found in Coffea arabica, and a quarter of that in Robusta coffee.

Coffea racemosa is endemic to the coastal forest belt between northern KwaZulu-Natal in South Africa and Mozambique, found in an area less than 150 km^{2} (58 sq mi) in size. It was widely cultivated by the Portuguese during the 1960–1970s in Mozambique; as of 2018 only two plantations, at Ibo Island and in Hluhluwe, remained.

== Cultivation ==
Coffea racemosa is an open-branched shrub or small tree growing up to 3.5 m (11 ft) tall. It has white to pinkish singular flowers (2 cm (1 in) in diameter) or in few-flowered clusters along the branches, which bloom between September and February. The fruit is near-spherical in shape and purple to black when ripe. The fruit is harvested from the wild for local use as a coffee. The beans are one third of the size of Arabica beans. The beans are roasted and ground to a powder then used to make coffee. Salt is sometimes sprinkled over them as they are roasted.

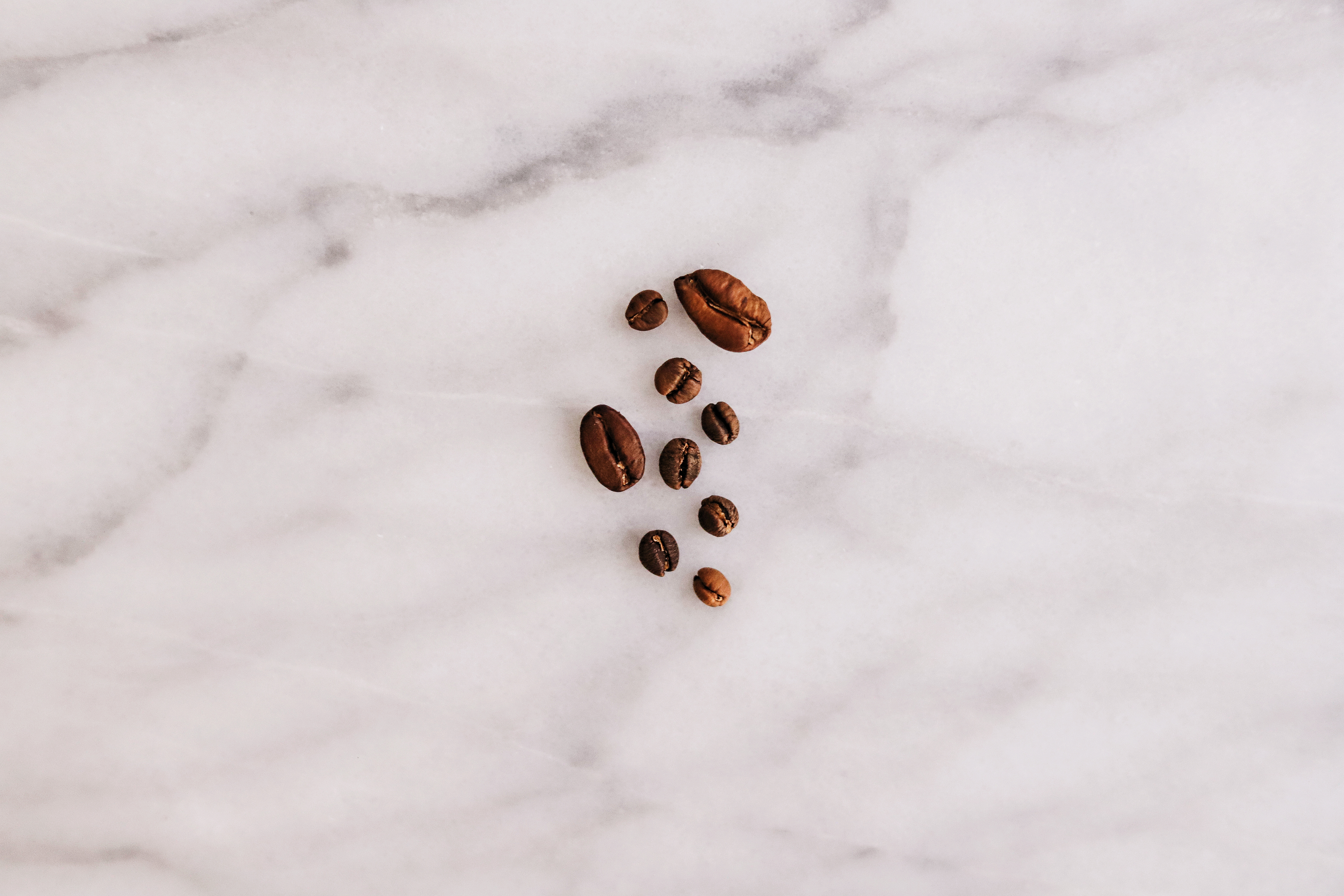
A visual comparison of the Racemosa Bean, Liberica Bean and Arabica Bean

== See also ==
- Coffea
