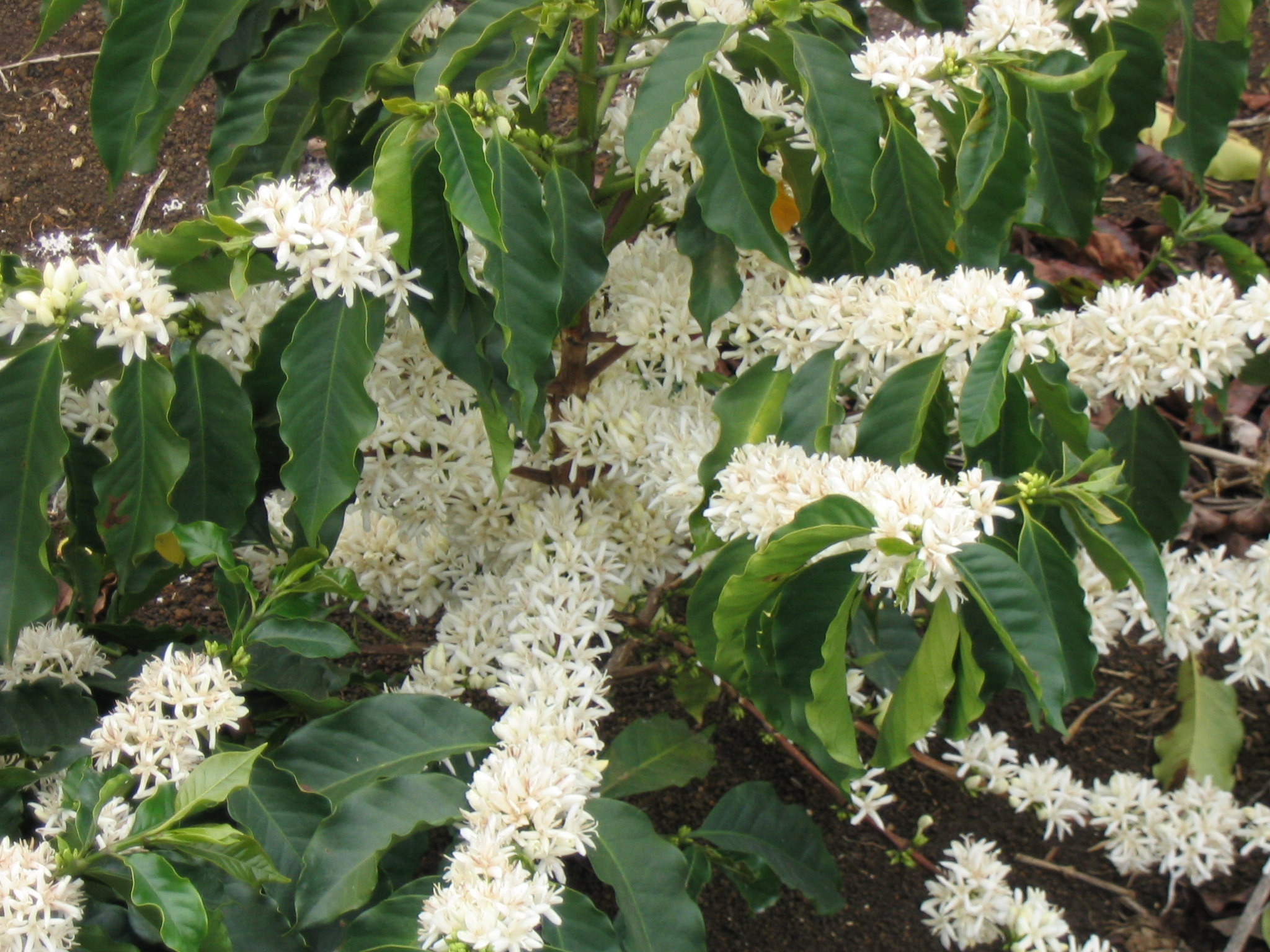
- Flowering branches of Coffea arabica

Scientific classification
- Kingdom: Plantae
- Clade: Tracheophytes
- Clade: Angiosperms
- Clade: Eudicots
- Clade: Asterids
- Order: Gentianales
- Family: Rubiaceae
- Tribe: Coffeeae
- Genus: Coffea; L.

Type species
- Coffea arabica L.

Synonyms
- Buseria T. Durand; Cafe Adans.; Cofeanthus A.Chev.; Hexepta Raf.; Leiochilus Hook. f.; Nescidia A. Rich.; Paracoffea J.-F.Leroy; Paolia Chiov.; Pleurocoffea Baill.; Psilanthopsis A. Chev.; Psilanthus Hook.f.; Solenixora Baill.

= Coffea =

Genus of flowering plants

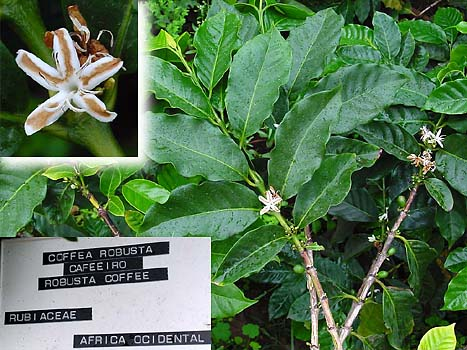
Coffea canephora

Coffea is a genus of flowering plants in the family Rubiaceae. Coffea species are shrubs or small trees native to tropical and southern Africa and tropical Asia. The seeds of some species, called coffee beans, are roasted and ground to brew into various coffee beverages. The fruits, like the seeds, contain a large amount of caffeine, and have a distinct sweet taste.

The plant ranks as one of the world's most valuable and widely traded commodity crops and is an important export product of several countries, including those in Central and South America, the Caribbean and Africa. The coffee trade relies heavily on two of the over 120 species, Coffea arabica (commonly known simply as "Arabica"), which accounts for around 55% of the world's coffee production, and Coffea canephora (known as "Robusta"), which accounts for around 45%.

Both coffee species are vulnerable to shifts, caused by climate change, in their growing zones, which are likely to result in a decline in production in some of the most important growing regions.

== Description ==
When grown in the tropics, coffee is a vigorous bush or small tree that usually grows to a height of 3–3.5 m (10–11 1/2 ft). Most commonly cultivated coffee species grow best at high elevations, but do not tolerate freezing temperatures.

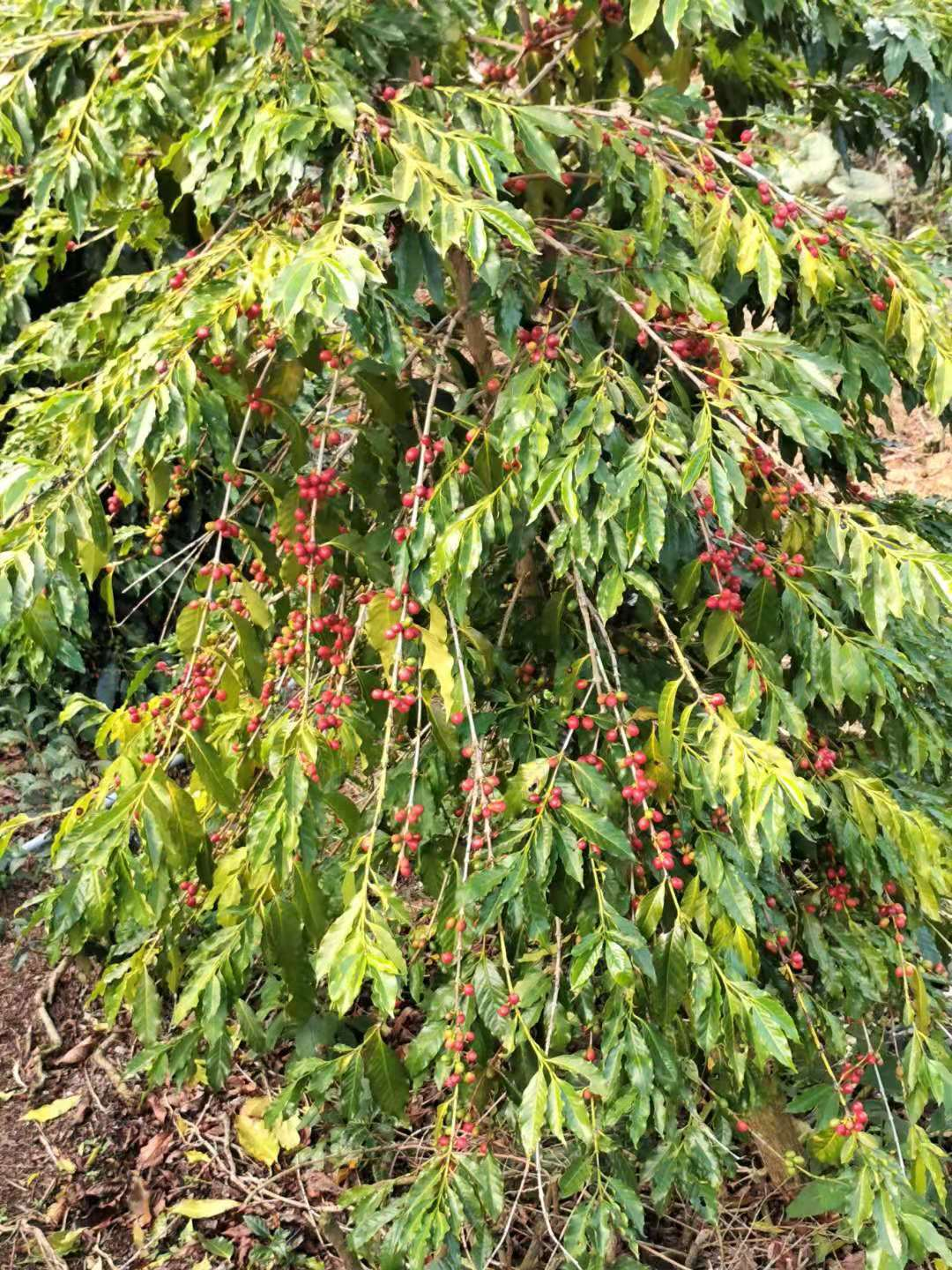
Coffea branches

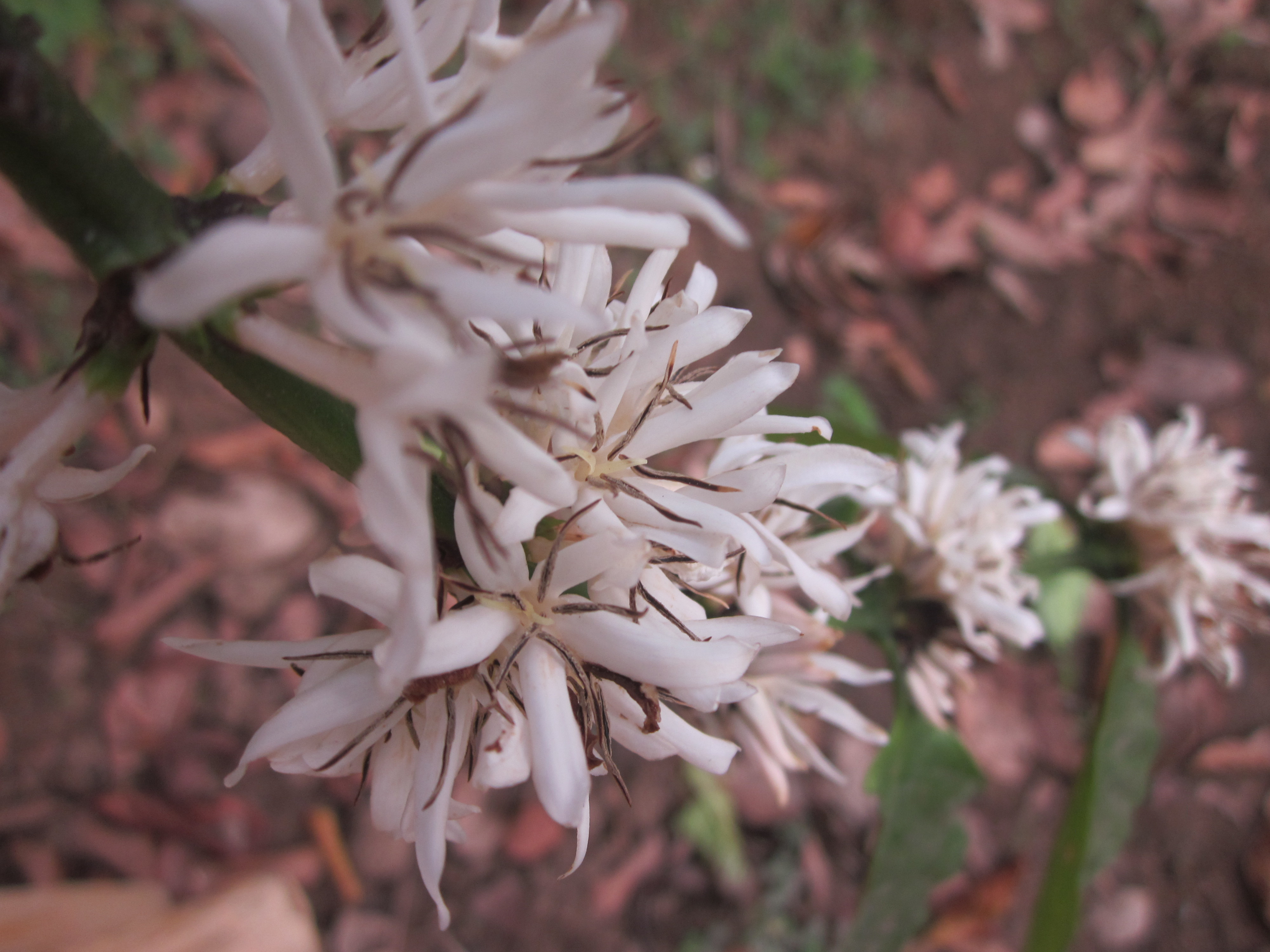
Coffea flower

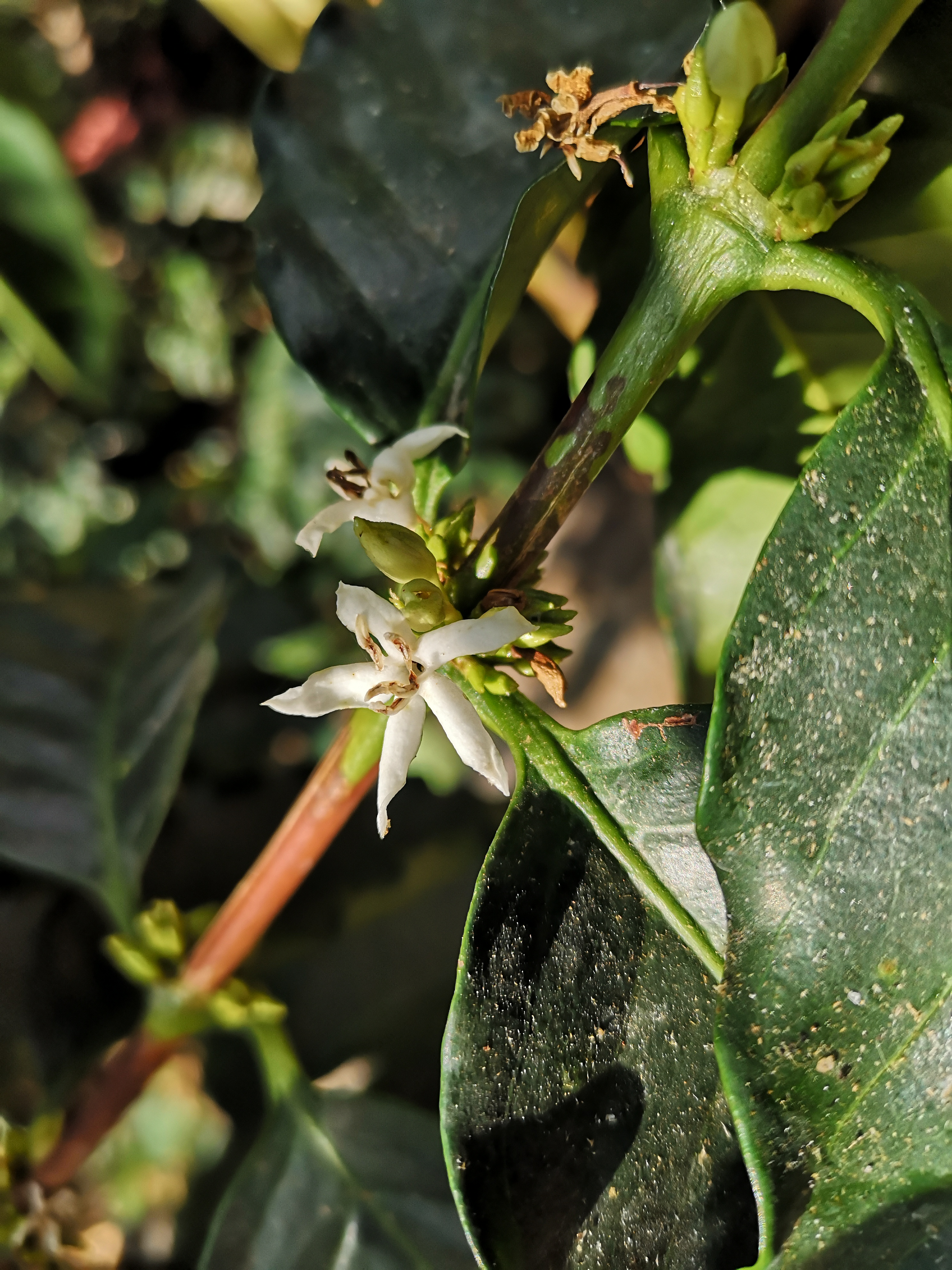
Coffea arabica flowers

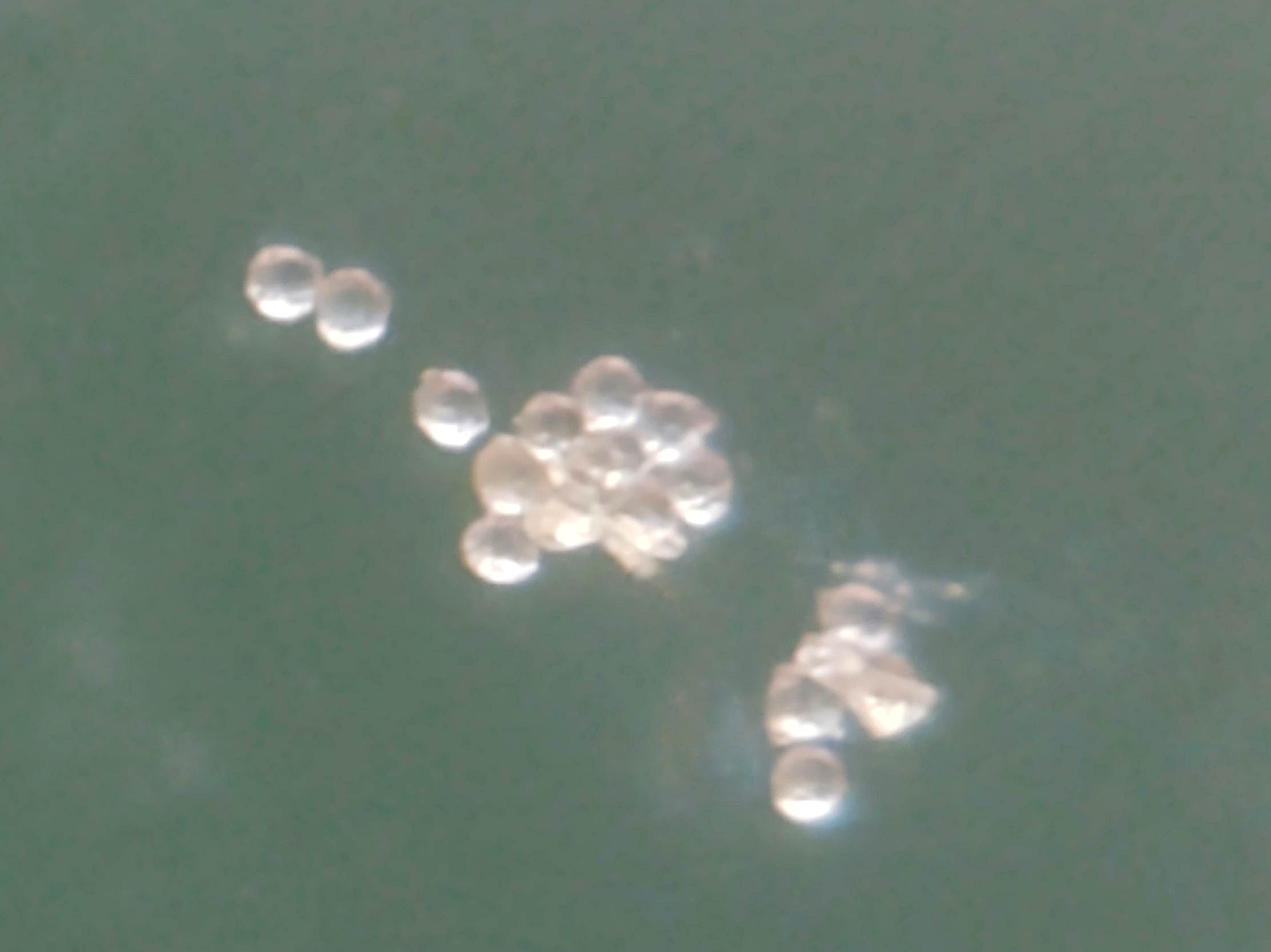
Pollen grains of Coffee plant

The white flowers are highly scented. The trees produce edible red or purple fruits that are either epigynous berries or indehiscent drupes. The fruit is often referred to as a "coffee cherry", and it contains two seeds, called "coffee beans". Despite these terms, coffee is neither a true cherry (the fruit of certain species in the genus Prunus) nor a true bean (seeds from plants in the family Fabaceae). The fruit takes about nine months to ripen. In any coffee crop, about 5–10% of fruits contain only a single bean. Called a peaberry, it is smaller and rounder than a normal coffee bean.

The Coffea arabica tree grows fruit after three to five years, producing for an average of 50 to 60 years, though up to 100 years is possible.

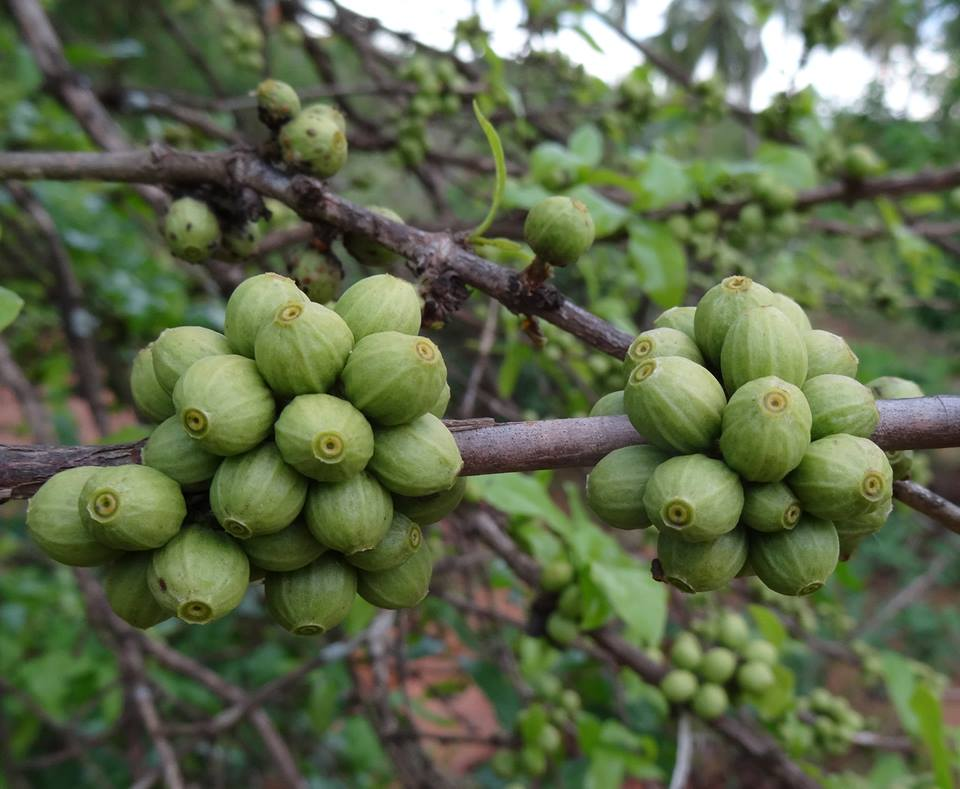
Coffea racemosa fruits

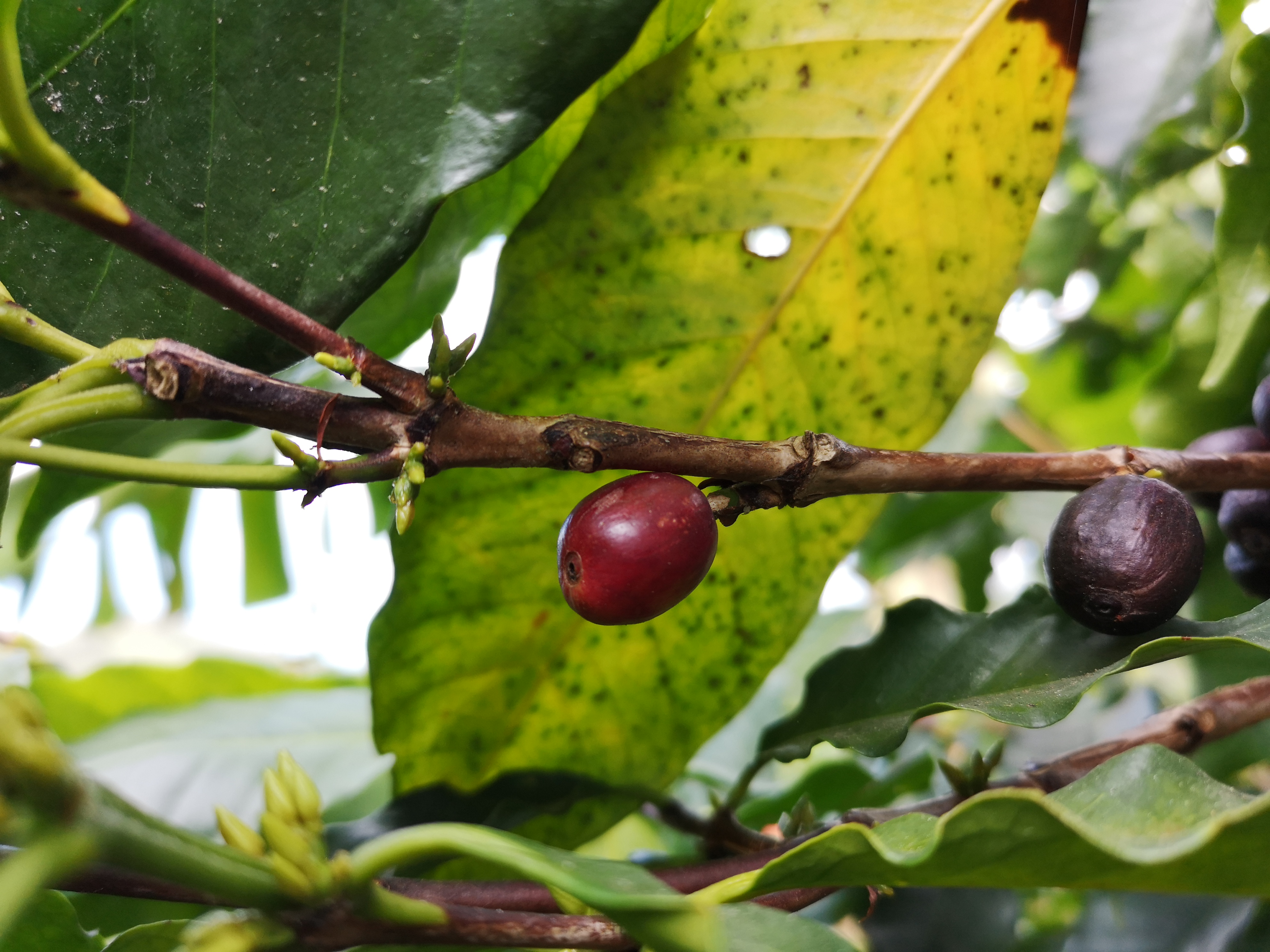
Ripe Coffea arabica fruits

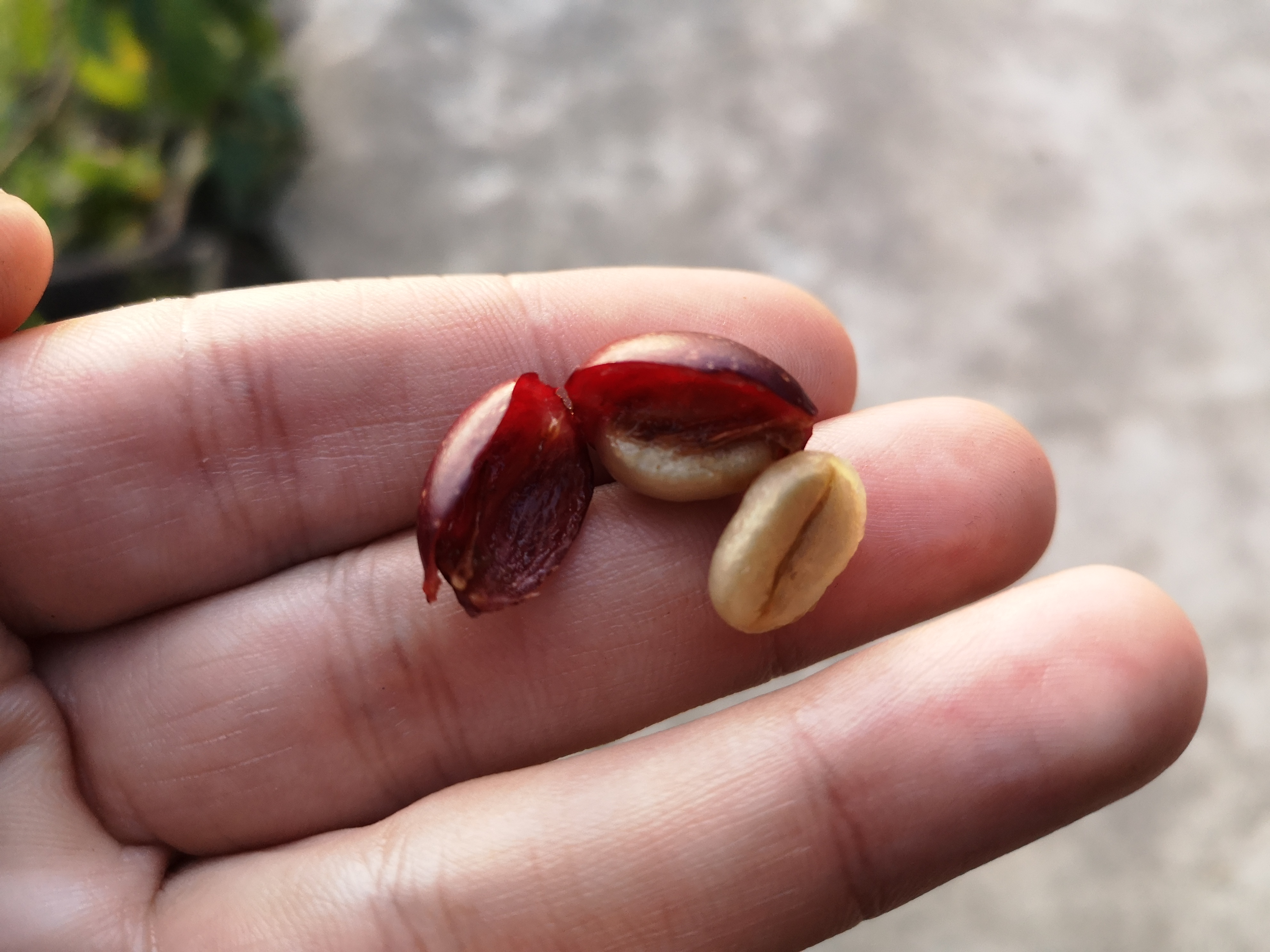
Beans inside a Coffea arabica fruit

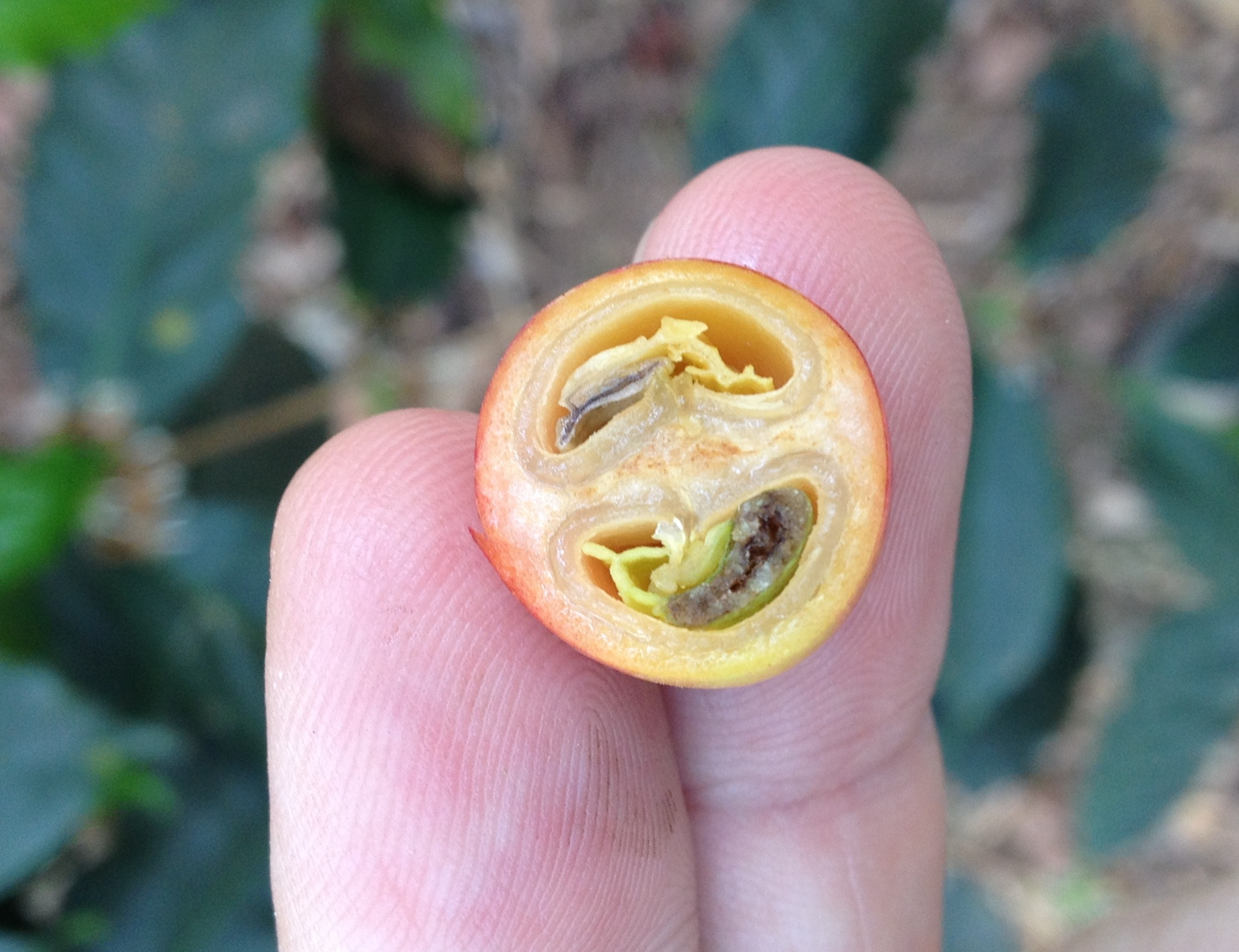
Coffea fruit cross section

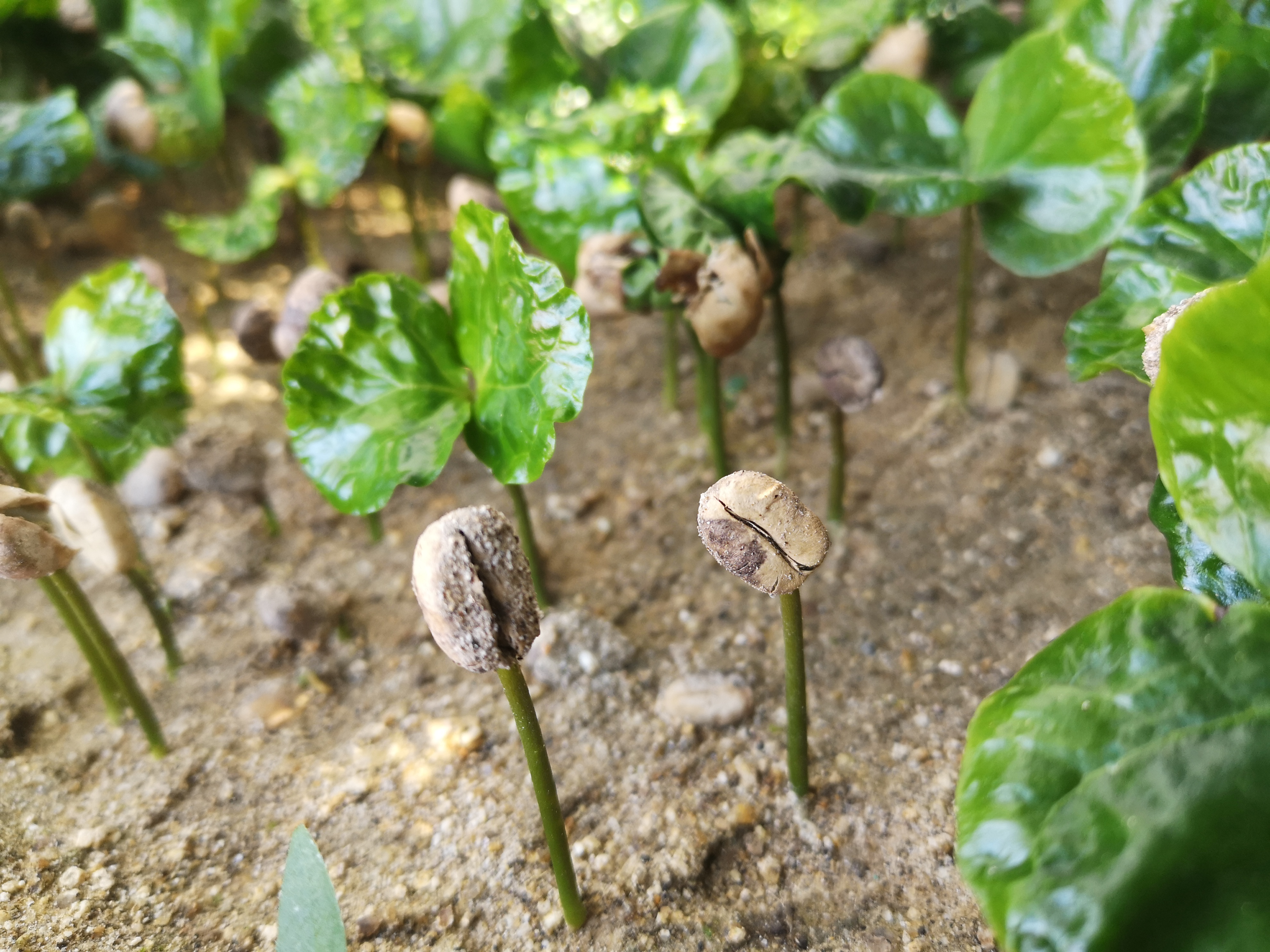
Coffea arabica beans germinating

== Taxonomy ==
The genus Coffea and the type species Coffea arabica were first described by Carl Linnaeus in 1753. New species of Coffea are still being identified in the 2000s. In 2008 and 2009, researchers from the Royal Botanic Gardens, Kew, named seven from the mountains of northern Madagascar, including C. ambongensis, C. boinensis, C. labatii, C. pterocarpa, C. bissetiae, and C. namorokensis.

In 2008, two new species were discovered in Cameroon: Coffea charrieriana, which is caffeine-free, and Coffea anthonyi. By crossing the new species with other known coffees, two new features might be introduced to cultivated coffee plants: decaffeinated beans and self-pollination.

In 2011, Coffea absorbed the twenty species of the former genus Psilanthus due to the morphological and genetic similarities between the two genera. Historically, the two have been considered distinct genera due to differences in the length of the corolla tube and the anther arrangement: Coffea with a short corolla tube and exserted style and anthers; Psilanthus with a long corolla tube and included anthers. However, these characteristics were not present in all species of either respective genus, making the two genera overwhelmingly similar in both morphology and genetic sequence. This transfer expanded Coffea from 104 species to 124, and extended its native distribution to tropical Asia and Australasia.

The coffee genome was published in 2014, with more than 25,000 genes identified. This revealed that coffee plants make caffeine using a different set of genes from those found in tea, cacao and other such plants.

A robust and almost fully resolved phylogeny of the entire genus was published in 2017. In addition to resolving the relationships of Coffea species, this study's results suggest Africa or Asia as the likely ancestral origin of Coffea and point to several independent radiations across Africa, Asia, and the Western Indian Ocean Islands.

In 2020, a technique of DNA fingerprinting, or genetic authentication of plant material, was proven effective for coffee. For the study, scientists used DNA extraction and SSR marker analysis. This technique or similar ones may allow for several improvements to coffee production such as improved information for farmers as to the susceptibility of their coffee plants to pests and disease, a professionalized coffee seed system, and transparency and traceability for buyers of green, un-roasted coffee.

=== Species ===
As of January 2026, Plants of the World Online accepts the following 133 species and one hybrid:

- Coffea abbayesii J.-F.Leroy
- Coffea affinis De Wild.
- Coffea alleizettii Dubard
- Coffea ambanjensis J.-F.Leroy
- Coffea ambongensis J.-F.Leroy ex A.P.Davis & Rakotonas.
- Coffea andrambovatensis J.-F.Leroy
- Coffea ankaranensis J.-F.Leroy ex A.P.Davis & Rakotonas.
- Coffea anthonyi Stoff. & F.Anthony
- Coffea arabica L.
- Coffea arenesiana J.-F.Leroy
- Coffea augagneurii Dubard
- Coffea bakossii Cheek & Bridson
- Coffea benghalensis B.Heyne ex Roth
- Coffea bertrandii A.Chev.
- Coffea betamponensis Portères & J.-F.Leroy
- Coffea bissetiae A.P.Davis & Rakotonas.
- Coffea boinensis A.P.Davis & Rakotonas.
- Coffea boiviniana (Baill.) Drake
- Coffea bonnieri Dubard
- Coffea brassii (J.-F.Leroy) A.P.Davis
- Coffea brevipes Hiern
- Coffea bridsoniae A.P.Davis & Mvungi
- Coffea buxifolia A.Chev.
- Coffea callmanderi A.P.Davis & Rakotonas.
- Coffea canephora Pierre ex A.Froehner
- Coffea carrissoi A.Chev.
- Coffea charrieriana Stoff. & F.Anthony
- Coffea cochinchinensis Pierre ex Pit.
- Coffea commersoniana (Baill.) A.Chev.
- Coffea congensis A.Froehner
- Coffea costatifructa Bridson
- Coffea coursiana J.-F.Leroy
- Coffea dactylifera Robbr. & Stoff.
- Coffea darainensis A.P.Davis & Rakotonas.
- Coffea decaryana J.-F.Leroy
- Coffea dewevrei De Wild. & T.Durand
- Coffea dubardii Jum.
- Coffea ebracteolata (Hiern) Brenan
- Coffea eugenioides S.Moore
- Coffea fadenii Bridson
- Coffea farafanganensis J.-F.Leroy
- Coffea floresiana Boerl.
- Coffea fotsoana Stoff. & Sonké
- Coffea fragilis J.-F.Leroy
- Coffea fragrans Wall. ex Hook.f.
- Coffea gallienii Dubard
- Coffea grevei Drake ex A.Chev.
- Coffea heimii J.-F.Leroy
- Coffea × heterocalyx Stoff.
- Coffea homollei J.-F.Leroy
- Coffea horsfieldiana Miq.
- Coffea humbertii J.-F.Leroy
- Coffea humblotiana Baill.
- Coffea humilis A.Chev.
- Coffea jumellei J.-F.Leroy
- Coffea kalobinonensis A.P.Davis & Rakotonas.
- Coffea kapakata (A.Chev.) Bridson
- Coffea kianjavatensis J.-F.Leroy
- Coffea kihansiensis A.P.Davis & Mvungi
- Coffea kimbozensis Bridson
- Coffea kivuensis Lebrun
- Coffea klainei Pierre ex De Wild.
- Coffea labatii A.P.Davis & Rakotonas.
- Coffea lancifolia A.Chev.
- Coffea lebruniana Germ. & Kesler
- Coffea leonimontana Stoff.
- Coffea leroyi A.P.Davis
- Coffea liaudii J.-F.Leroy ex A.P.Davis
- Coffea liberica W.Bull
- Coffea ligustroides S.Moore
- Coffea littoralis A.P.Davis & Rakotonas.
- Coffea lulandoensis Bridson
- Coffea mabesae (Elmer) J.-F.Leroy
- Coffea macrocarpa A.Rich.
- Coffea madurensis Teijsm. & Binn. ex Koord.
- Coffea magnistipula Stoff. & Robbr.
- Coffea malabarica (Sivar., Biju & P.Mathew) A.P.Davis
- Coffea mangoroensis Portères
- Coffea mannii (Hook.f.) A.P.Davis
- Coffea manombensis A.P.Davis
- Coffea mapiana Sonké, Nguembou & A.P.Davis
- Coffea mauritiana Lam.
- Coffea mayombensis A.Chev.
- Coffea mcphersonii A.P.Davis & Rakotonas.
- Coffea melanocarpa Welw. ex Hiern
- Coffea merguensis Ridl.
- Coffea microdubardii A.P.Davis & Rakotonas.
- Coffea millotii J.-F.Leroy
- Coffea minutiflora A.P.Davis & Rakotonas.
- Coffea mogenetii Dubard
- Coffea mongensis Bridson
- Coffea montekupensis Stoff.
- Coffea montis-sacri A.P.Davis
- Coffea moratii J.-F.Leroy ex A.P.Davis & Rakotonas.
- Coffea mufindiensis Hutch. ex Bridson
- Coffea myrtifolia (A.Rich. ex DC.) J.-F.Leroy
- Coffea namorokensis A.P.Davis & Rakotonas.
- Coffea neobridsoniae A.P.Davis
- Coffea neoleroyi A.P.Davis
- Coffea perrieri Drake ex Jum. & H.Perrier
- Coffea pervilleana (Baill.) Drake
- Coffea pocsii Bridson
- Coffea pseudozanguebariae Bridson
- Coffea pterocarpa A.P.Davis & Rakotonas.
- Coffea pustulata A.P.Davis & Rakotonas.
- Coffea racemosa Lour.
- Coffea rakotonasoloi A.P.Davis
- Coffea ratsimamangae J.-F.Leroy ex A.P.Davis & Rakotonas.
- Coffea resinosa (Hook.f.) Radlk.
- Coffea rhamnifolia (Chiov.) Bridson
- Coffea richardii J.-F.Leroy
- Coffea rizetiana Stoff. & Noirot
- Coffea rupicola A.P.Davis & Rakotonas.
- Coffea sahafaryensis J.-F.Leroy
- Coffea sakarahae J.-F.Leroy
- Coffea salvatrix Swynn. & Philipson
- Coffea sambavensis J.-F.Leroy ex A.P.Davis & Rakotonas.
- Coffea sapinii (De Wild.) A.P.Davis
- Coffea schliebenii Bridson
- Coffea semsei (Bridson) A.P.Davis
- Coffea sessiliflora Bridson
- Coffea stenophylla G.Don
- Coffea tetragona Jum. & H.Perrier
- Coffea togoensis A.Chev.
- Coffea toshii A.P.Davis & Rakotonas.
- Coffea travancorensis Wight & Arn.
- Coffea tricalysioides J.-F.Leroy
- Coffea tsirananae J.-F.Leroy
- Coffea vatovavyensis J.-F.Leroy
- Coffea vavateninensis J.-F.Leroy
- Coffea vianneyi J.-F.Leroy
- Coffea vohemarensis A.P.Davis & Rakotonas.
- Coffea wightiana Wall. ex Wight & Arn.
- Coffea zanguebariae Lour.

== Ecology ==
The caffeine in coffee beans serves as a toxic substance that protects against insects and other pests, a form of natural plant defense against herbivory. Caffeine simultaneously attracts pollinators, specifically honeybees, by creating an olfactory memory that signals bees to return to the plant's flowers. Not all Coffea species contain caffeine, and the earliest species had little or no caffeine content. Caffeine has evolved independently in multiple lineages of Coffea in Africa, perhaps in response to high pest predation in the humid environments of West-Central Africa.

Caffeine has also evolved independently in the more distantly related genera Theobroma (cacao) and Camellia (tea). This suggests that caffeine production is an adaptive trait in coffee and plant evolution. The fruit and leaves also contain caffeine, and can be used to make coffee cherry tea and coffee-leaf tea. The fruit is also used in many brands of soft drink as well as pre-packaged teas.

Several insect pests affect coffee production, including the coffee borer beetle (Hypothenemus hampei) and the coffee leafminer (Leucoptera caffeina).

Coffee is used as a food plant by the larvae of some Lepidoptera (butterfly and moth) species, Dalcera abrasa, turnip moth and some members of the genus Endoclita, including E. damor and E. malabaricus.

== Cultivation and use ==
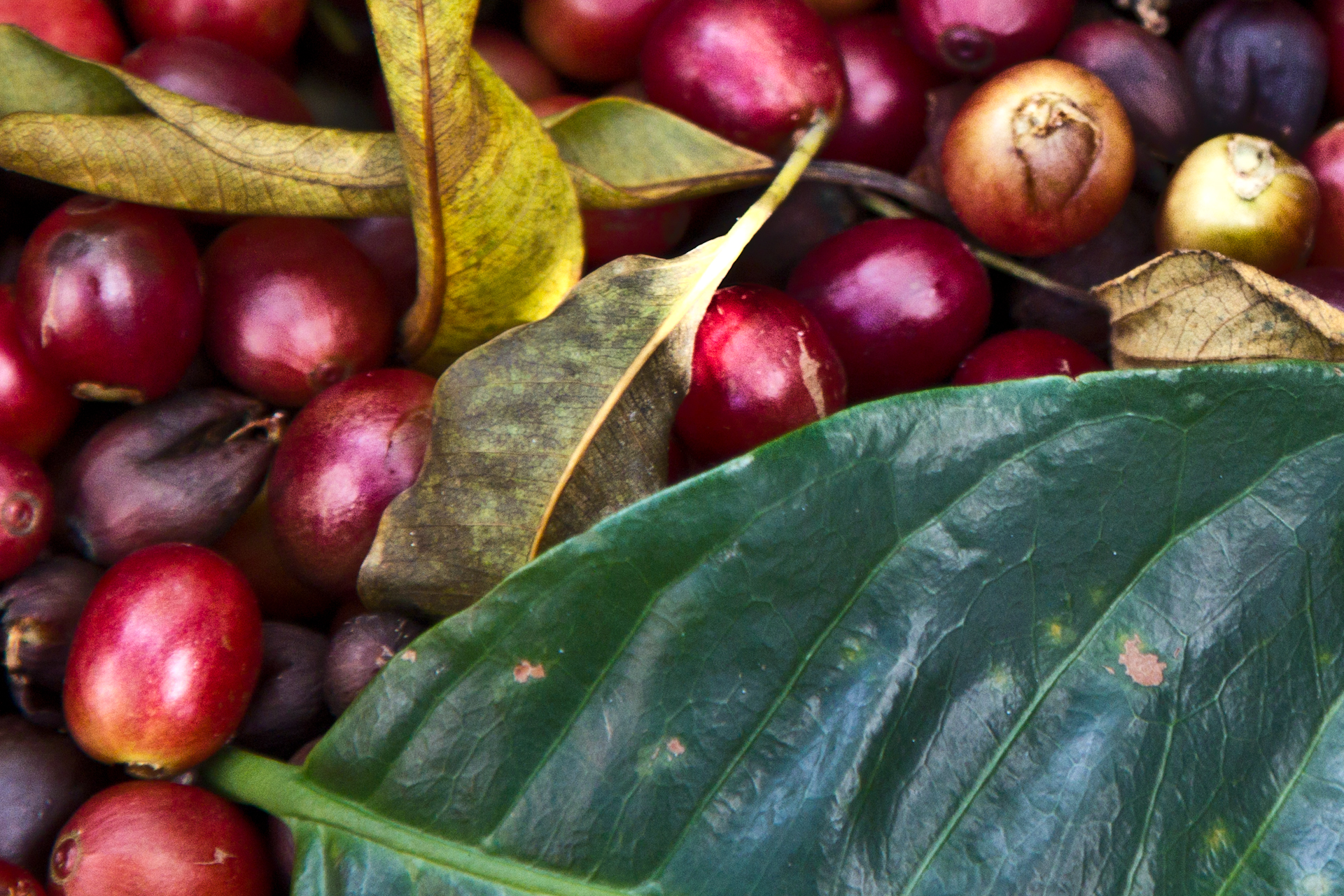
Freshly harvested coffee cherries

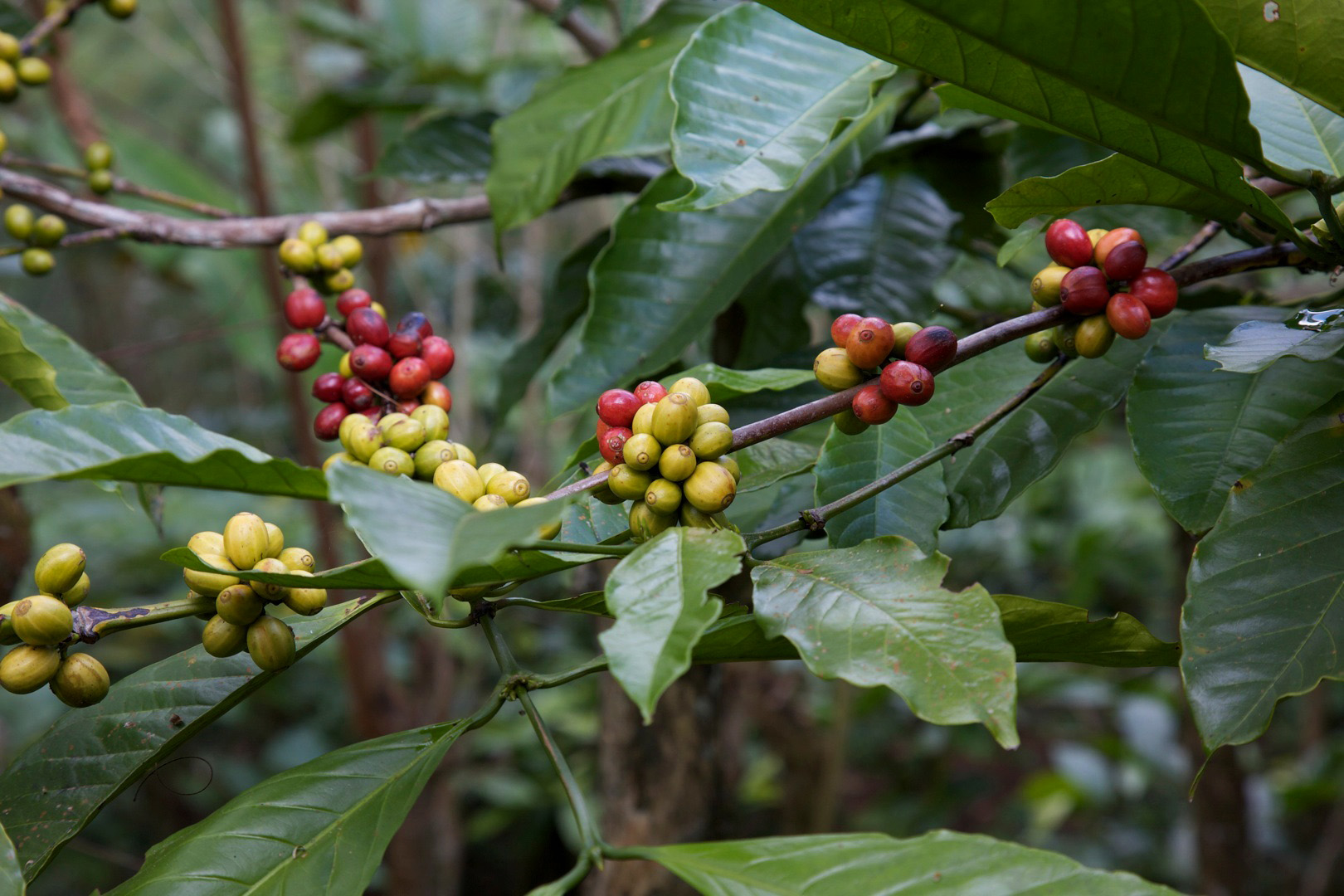
Coffea fruits, Bali

There are over 130 species of Coffea, which is grown from seed. The two most popular are Coffea arabica (commonly known simply as "Arabica"), which accounts around 55% of the world's coffee production, and Coffea canephora (known as "Robusta"), which accounts for about 45%. C. arabica is preferred for its sweeter taste, while C. canephora has a higher caffeine content. C. arabica has its origins in the highlands of Ethiopia and the Boma Plateau of Sudan, and came about as the result of a hybrid between C. canephora and C. eugenioides.
