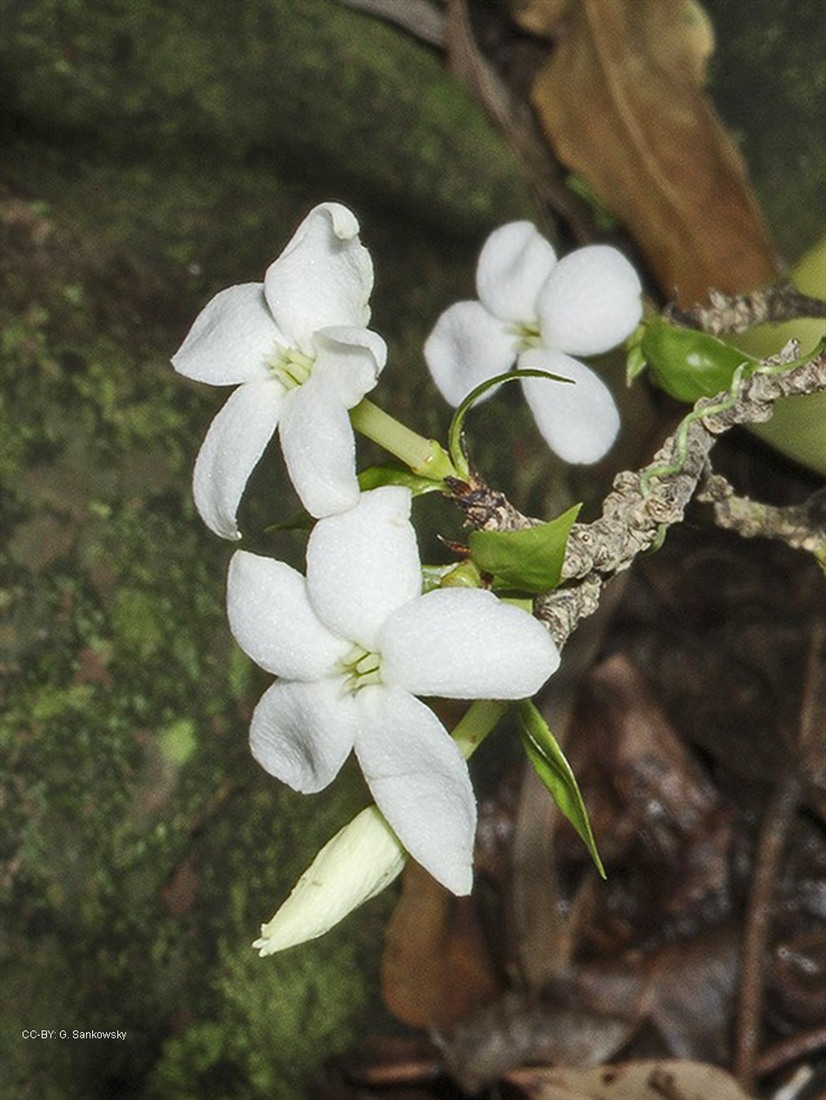
- Flowers

Conservation status
- Least Concern (IUCN 3.1)

Scientific classification
- Kingdom: Plantae
- Clade: Tracheophytes
- Clade: Angiosperms
- Clade: Eudicots
- Clade: Asterids
- Order: Gentianales
- Family: Rubiaceae
- Genus: Coffea
- Species: C. brassii

Binomial name
- Coffea brassii (J.-F.Leroy) A.P.Davis

Synonyms
- Paracoffea brassii J.-F.Leroy; Psilanthus brassii (J.-F.Leroy) A.P.Davis

= Coffea brassii =

Species of flowering plant

Coffea brassii is a species of plant in the coffee and gardenia family Rubiaceae. It is native to Papua New Guinea and to Cape York Peninsula in northern Queensland, Australia. It has the conservation status of least concern from both the Queensland Government and the International Union for Conservation of Nature

It is a shrub growing to about 2 m (6 ft 7 in) tall with leaves reaching about 8 cm (3.1 in) long by 4 cm (1.6 in) wide. It was first described in 1967 by French botanist Jean-François Leroy, from material collected in Papua New Guinea. It was initially placed in the genus Psilanthus and transferred to Coffea in a review of the former genus by Aaron Paul Davis in 2010.
