= Coffea charrieriana =

Conservation status
- Critically Endangered (IUCN 3.1)

Scientific classification
- Kingdom: Plantae
- Clade: Tracheophytes
- Clade: Angiosperms
- Clade: Eudicots
- Clade: Asterids
- Order: Gentianales
- Family: Rubiaceae
- Genus: Coffea
- Species: C. charrieriana

Binomial name
- Coffea charrieriana Stoff. & F.Anthony

Species of coffee plant

Coffea charrieriana, also known as Charrier coffee, is a species of flowering plant from the Coffea genus. It is a caffeine-free coffee plant endemic to Cameroon in Central Africa. It is the first recorded caffeine-free Coffea in Central Africa, and the second to be recorded in Africa. The first caffeine-free species was previously discovered in Kenya, named C. pseudozanguebariae. The International Institute for Species Exploration at Arizona State University and a committee of taxonomists and scientists voted C. charrieriana as one of the top 10 species described in 2008.

== Description ==
=== Vegetative characteristics ===
Coffea charrieriana is a 1–1.5 m (3 ft 3 in – 4 ft 11 in) tall shrub with 1–2 mm (0.039–0.079 in) wide branchlets. The deltate to triangular, 2 mm (0.079 in) long stipules are pubescent. The small, thin, glabrous, smooth, elliptic to broadly elliptic, (4–)5–7(–8) cm long, and 2.2–3.5 cm wide leaves have a slightly wedged shape, while the apex tapers to a round tip. This tapering point is roughly 7–13 mm (0.28–0.51 in) long. The petioles is 2 mm (0.079 in) long. There are 3–7 secondary nerve cells per side of the midvein. The thread-like tertiary veins are reticulated. The leaf also has domatia structures. The upper epidermis is 20–30 μm thich, the palisade mesophyll is 20–30 μm thick, the spongy mesophyll is 45–70 μm thick, and the lower epidermis is 10–20 μm thick. The relatively thin leaves are 100–130 μm thick and have very few secondary nerves.

=== Generative characteristics ===
Per axil, there are 1(–2) solitary inflorescences. The flowers have two calyculi. The lower calyculus has a rim shape with two smaller leaf lobes. The upper calyculus has two broadly triangular shaped stipular lobes and two narrowly shaped elliptical foliar lobes. The flowers have no stalk and consist of five petals. The white corolla tube is 1 mm (0.039 in) long while the lobes are 5–8 mm (0.20–0.31 in) long and 2–3 mm (0.079–0.118 in) broad. A small nectary disc sits on the top of the ovary. The anthers and style protrude out from the flower. The anthers are also attached to the corolla. The short filament that connects to the zone between the tube, lobes and corolla is not semi-transparent. C. charrieriana also possesses a corolla tube (1 mm long), style (10 mm long), two lobed stigma (2 mm long), anther (3 mm long) and anther filament (2 mm long). The pedunculate, red and fleshy, 9 mm–10 mm × 7 mm (0.35 in–0.39 in × 0.28 in) drupes contain two pyrenes, with one seed per pyrene. The elliptic, 5 mm (0.20 in) long, and 4 mm (0.16 in) wide seed has a parenchymatous seed coat. The fruit is connected to a hairless peduncle that is 2 mm (0.079 in) long. Comparatively to other Coffea species, C. charrieriana lacks sclereids in its seed coat. Characteristically of Coffea species, the seed is rounded, smooth and grooved.

=== Phytochemistry ===
Biochemical analysis of the seeds reveals that they are caffeine-free, this caffeine-free biochemical characteristic is generally found in Madagascan Coffea species. It is the second caffeine-free species, along with C. pseudozanguebariae which grows in a coastal dry forest near the Indian Ocean. It is suggested that the absence of caffeine in the Coffea species is due to spliceosome deficiency. Though the plants contain the necessary genes to produce caffeine, due to a malfunction in the protein synthesis pathway as a result of incorrect splicing patterns, caffeine is not produced. Caffeine absence is caused by a monogenic inheritance pattern, with the involvement of one gene and two alleles; the plant containing the recessive allele leads to no caffeine content. On the other hand, it is likely that caffeine production level is controlled by polygenic inheritance and the amount of caffeine produced is a genetic factor. Through further analysis, it was found that instead of accumulation of caffeine, the deficient caffeine synthase gene responsible for caffeine production had instead produced a substance called theobromine in its place. This discovery by scientists led to further understanding about the genetics of caffeine in Coffea plants, and the ability to hybridize coffee plants with caffeine-free plants to produce a decaf line of seeds with lower caffeine concentrations. It also opened up the option of removing this particular gene in plants containing caffeine to create a caffeine-free plant.

Compared to other Coffea, C. charrieriana along with C. canephora and C. mannii has a significantly lower linoleic acid percentage. C. charrieriana also had the lowest polyunsaturated fatty acid content (<30%) and 0.8% dry matter basis. As a result, though originating from Africa, C. charrieriana is closer phylogenetically to Madagascan than African species (Dussert et al. 2008, 2953). By examining C. charrieriana's leaf components, it forms a separate gene cluster to C. anthonyi, C. arabica, C. canephora, C. humilis, C. kapakata, C. liberica, C. liberica var. liberica and C. mannii. C. charrieriana also has lower caffeoylquinic acids (CQA) than other Coffea species. From analysing the fatty acid content alone, C. charrieriana is most closely related to C. congensis and forms a separate clade from the other 59 Coffea genotypes.

Further genetic analysis of long tandem repeat retrotransposons (LTR-RT), more specifically of the lineages SIRE and Del, were analysed in C. charrieriana. LTR-RT are redundant sections of the plant genome. It was found that whilst other West and Central African Coffea species contained 4.5–5.1% of SIRE lineage, C. charrieriana contained 3.2%. In addition, C. charrieriana also had the lowest percentage of Del fraction, at 13.1% compared to 14–16.2% found in other West and Central African species. This suggests that with the observations of SIRE and Del, C. charrieriana is genetically distinct to its geographical counterpart species.

Coffea charrieriana also has the largest chloroplast genome within the Coffea genus. When clustering the 52 species from Coffea and Psilanthus, C. charrieriana, along with another species, P. travancorensis, were excluded from the clusters due to poor analysis results. Though C. charrieriana originates from Cameroon, genetic results suggest a placement of C. charrieriana between the two genera of Psilanthus and Coffea. It is genetically similar to West and Central African Coffea species but shares morphological similarities with Psilanthus, such as its vegetation. The difficulty in grouping C. charrieriana is likely the result of ancient hybridisation between C. charrieriana and a Psilanthus chloroplast, leading to a mixed genome.

Alkaloids are found in many plants including coffee and tea, but only very small amounts are present in C. charrieriana.

== Taxonomy ==
It was described by Piet Stoffelen and François Anthony in 2008. The type specimen was collected in Cameroon in the Bakossi Forest Reserve, 2km east of a bridge on the Mungo River.

== Distribution and habitat ==
This plant is endemic to West Cameroon in the Bakossi Forest Reserve. It grows in a habitat of wet rainforest on rocky slopes of an altitude of 160 m and a mean elevation range of 300 m. It is highly threatened by deforestation for logging and palm oil production in its vulnerable lowland forest habitat.

== Conservation ==
Coffea charrieriana is a critically endangered species and is only known from one location.

== History ==
Coffea charrieriana was discovered in 2008 and the findings were published in a paper named "A new caffeine-free coffee from Cameroon" to the Botanical Journal of the Linnean Society. The plant was named by authors of the paper, Piet Stoffelen and Francois Anthony, in honour of Professor André Charrier who had made significant efforts towards the coffee industry. His work included leading the coffee breeding research and collection at Institute Research for Development (IRD) for the last 30 years of the 20th century. He also held a position at the French Office of Genetic Resources (BRG) from 1988 to 1993. He is currently working as the director of research at National Institute for Agricultural Research (INRA), focusing on plant genetics and breeding.

As a result of collaboration between the Institute of Research for Development (IRD), Biodiversity International, Paris Museum of Natural History and the French Agricultural Research Centre from 1966 to 1987, coffee plants from Madagascar, Comoros, Mascarene Islands, Guinea, Ivory Coast, Cameroon, Central Africa, Congo, Ethiopia, Kenya and Tanzania were collected. The cuttings from C. charrieriana were first collected in 1985 from Bakossi Forest Reserve in Cameroon in Central Africa along with 70 other Coffea species, many of which were already taxonomically identified. Though C. charrieriana was identified as morphologically different to previously identified Coffea species, further work was not done until 1997. In 1997 the cuttings were sent to the Institute of Research for Development (IRD) in which further study such as observations of the seed coat, anatomical observations of the leaves and biochemical analysis was undertaken. It was not until 2008, after morphological and genetic studies of this species, that it was recognised as a new species of Coffea. Genotyping analysis reveals C. charrieriana to have diverged from a common ancestor 11.15 million years ago.

== Cultivation and use ==
Coffea charrieriana grows in wet places with plenty of sunshine. During dry periods, the species undergoes floral bud morphogenesis, but the flowering buds do not emerge until the next rainfall event. After rain, a flowering event is seen in seven days. The time it takes for flowering of all Coffea species ranges from 5–13 days, making correct timing of hybridization difficult.

Similar to other Coffea species, the fleshy fruit of C. charrieriana contains edible beans. These can be prepared by drying, roasting or grinding, generally to make coffee. As a naturally occurring caffeine-free coffee, it provides an alternative over artificially decaffeinated coffee. With increasing demand for decaffeinated coffee, methods such as plant hybridization between coffee-free species, biotechnology interference of genetics and chemical extraction have been used to artificially decrease caffeine content. Generally, the presence of caffeine acts on the tastebuds, giving caffeinated products a distinct flavour, so as a caffeine-free species, C. charrieriana may not be preferable to coffee drinkers who prefer the taste provided by caffeine. C. charrieriana can be used in plant hybridization as the theobromine can be transferable between breeds, allowing caffeine concentration to be altered when crossed with a species containing caffeine. Seeds from C. charrieriana are currently being developed to become the first naturally caffeine-free coffee available on the market, this bean being coined Decaffito by Brazilian developers.

Another possible use of C. charrieriana is extracting 5-caffeoylquinic acids (CQA) from the coffee leaves, as most Coffea species, including C. charrieriana, contain natural antioxidant compounds. This natural antioxidant can be used in food and nutraceuticals.
