= Coffea kapakata =

Conservation status
- Data Deficient (IUCN 3.1)

Scientific classification
- Kingdom: Plantae
- Clade: Tracheophytes
- Clade: Angiosperms
- Clade: Eudicots
- Clade: Asterids
- Order: Gentianales
- Family: Rubiaceae
- Genus: Coffea
- Species: C. kapakata

Binomial name
- Coffea kapakata (A.Chev.) Bridson

Species of flowering plant

Coffea kapakata, also known as kapakata, is a putative species of plant in the genus Coffea, more commonly known as coffee, that is native to western Angola and Congo. Specimens were collected in 1932, but precise locality details are uncertain, and no other specimens have since been discovered. Because so little information is known about it, its conservation status is categorised as 'data deficient'.
