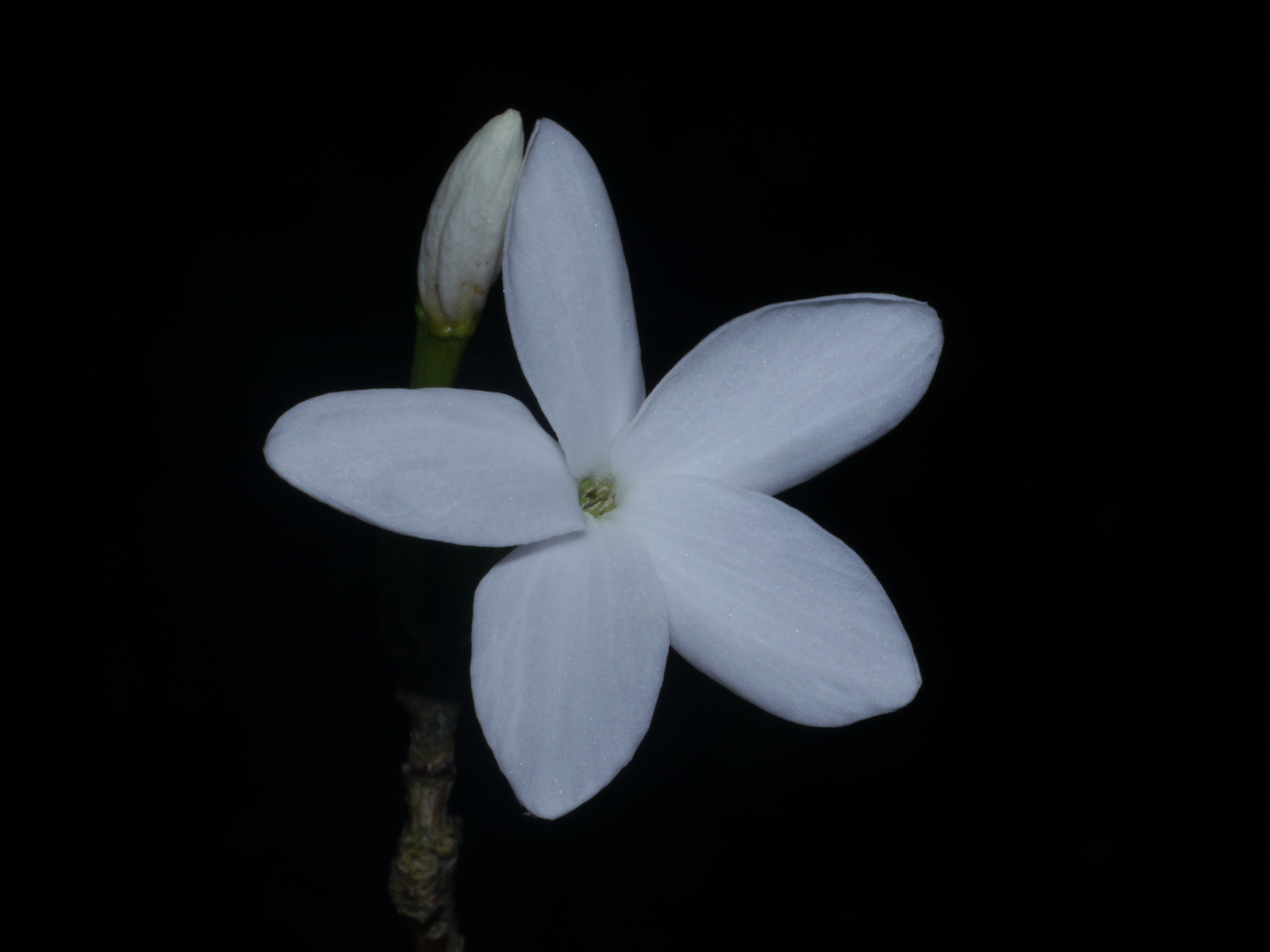

Conservation status
- Least Concern (IUCN 3.1)

Scientific classification
- Kingdom: Plantae
- Clade: Tracheophytes
- Clade: Angiosperms
- Clade: Eudicots
- Clade: Asterids
- Order: Gentianales
- Family: Rubiaceae
- Genus: Coffea
- Species: C. benghalensis

Binomial name
- Coffea benghalensis B. Heyne ex Schult. 1819

= Coffea benghalensis =

Species of flowering plant

Coffea benghalensis is a species of Coffea found in India, Bangladesh, Bhutan, and Nepal.

It is primarily found in tropical and subtropical moist broadleaf forests in damp areas such as along streams, but can also be found in dry mixed forests and sal (Shorea robusta) forests such as the Mahananda Wildlife Sanctuary in West Bengal, as well as monsoon forests, where it forms a thick undergrowth layer. It is a common species throughout its range in areas such as the forests of West Bengal and Meghalaya, and in some areas such as the Gandaki River basin in Nepal, it is a major component of the shrub flora.

It is often found in disturbed sites such as degraded sal forests as well as waste areas, indicating a degree of tolerance to habitat disturbance. However, it may be threatened in some areas by habitat destruction for agricultural and urban expansion, and some of its major habitats such as the Lower Gangetic Plains moist deciduous forests have been highly impacted by this.

== See also ==
- Coffee
