= Coffea abbayesii =

Conservation status
- Endangered (IUCN 3.1)

Scientific classification
- Kingdom: Plantae
- Clade: Tracheophytes
- Clade: Angiosperms
- Clade: Eudicots
- Clade: Asterids
- Order: Gentianales
- Family: Rubiaceae
- Genus: Coffea
- Species: C. abbayesii

Binomial name
- Coffea abbayesii J.-F.Leroy

Species of plant

Coffea abbayesii is an endangered species of flowering plant in the family Rubiaceae. It is endemic to Madagascar. It was described by Jean-François Leroy in 1961.

== Range and habitat ==
Coffea abbayesii is native to Andohahela National Park and a few other nearby locations in southeastern Madagascar. It is native to humid evergreen lowland forest. It has also been found in degraded forests on rocky soil. It is most often found between 400 and 500 meters elevation, but ranges from 250 to 1,000 meters.

The estimated extent of occurrence (EOO) is 117 km^{2}, and the area of occupancy (AOO) is 20 km^{2}.

== Conservation and threats ==
Four subpopulations have been recorded. The overall population and population trends are not well understood. The population in Andohahela National Park is thought to be well protected. Those outside the park are subject to habitat loss and degradation, including deforestation for timber and fuel wood, and human-set fires to clear land for livestock grazing, shifting agriculture. The species is assessed as Endangered because of its small range and declining habitat.

== See also ==
- Coffea
- Coffee
