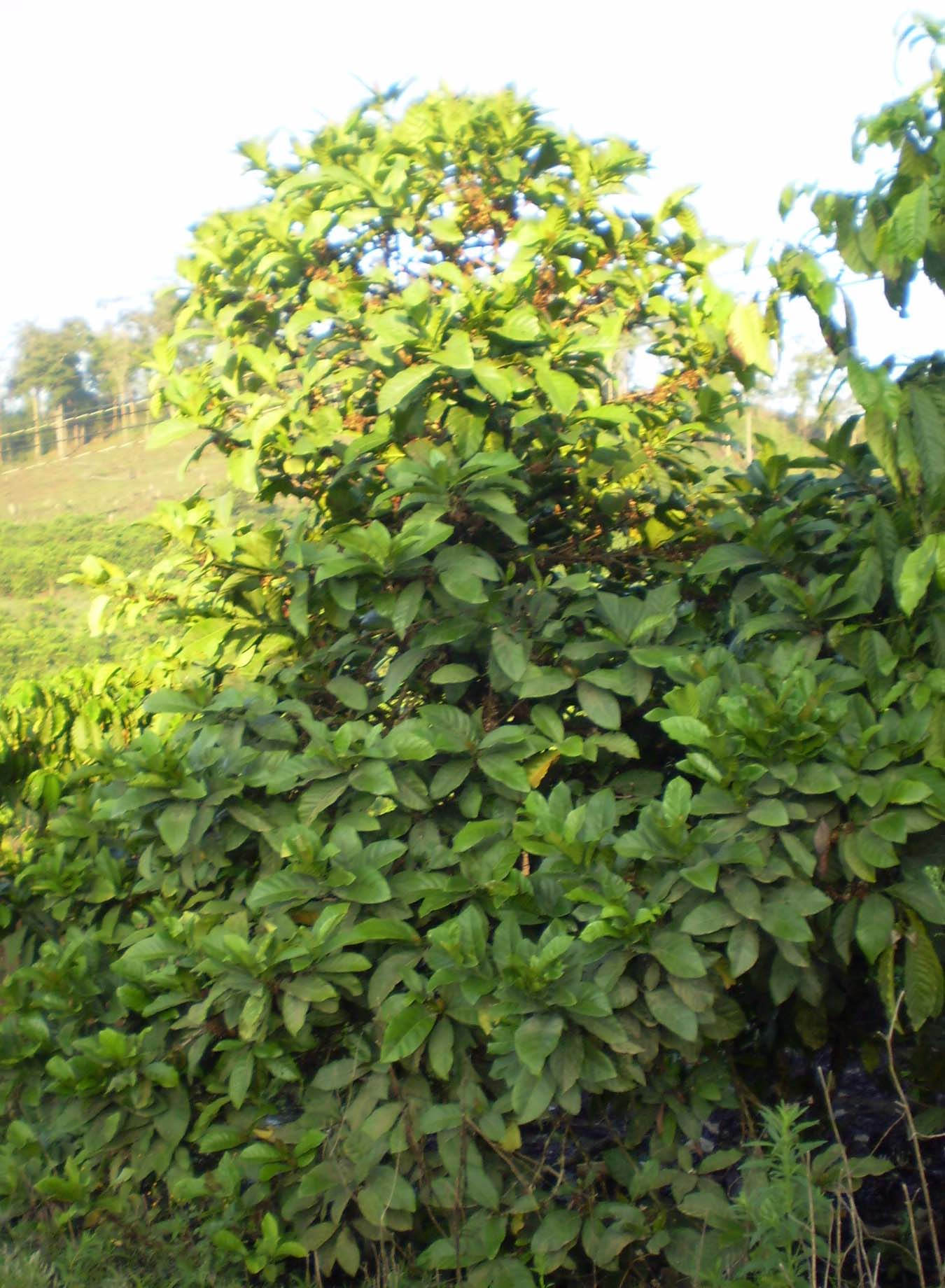

Conservation status
- Least Concern (IUCN 3.1)

Scientific classification
- Kingdom: Plantae
- Clade: Embryophytes
- Clade: Tracheophytes
- Clade: Spermatophytes
- Clade: Angiosperms
- Clade: Eudicots
- Clade: Asterids
- Order: Gentianales
- Family: Rubiaceae
- Genus: Coffea
- Species: C. magnistipula

Binomial name
- Coffea magnistipula Stoff. & Robbr.

= Coffea magnistipula =

Species of plant

Coffea magnistipula is a species of flowering plant in the family Rubiaceae. It is a shrub species of Coffea that is endemic to the Lower Guinean forests of tropical West Africa, specifically the South Cameroon Plateau and the Chaillu Massif of Gabon. Its scientific name is derived from the large stipules in which rain water and debris collects. The plant is unusual among Coffea species in having adventitious roots.

== See also ==
- Coffee
