= Decaffeination =

Removal of caffeine

Decaffeination is the removal of caffeine from coffee beans, cocoa, tea leaves, and other caffeine-containing materials. Decaffeinated products are commonly termed by the abbreviation decaf. To ensure product quality, manufacturers are required to test the newly decaffeinated coffee beans to make sure that caffeine concentration is relatively low. A caffeine content reduction of at least 97% is required under United States FDA standards. A 2006 study found decaffeinated drinks to contain typically 1–2% of the original caffeine content, but sometimes as much as 20%.

== Decaffeinated coffee ==
Friedlieb Ferdinand Runge performed the first isolation of caffeine from coffee beans in 1820, after the German poet Goethe heard about his work on belladonna extract, and requested he perform an analysis on coffee beans. Though Runge was able to isolate the compound, he did not learn much about the chemistry of caffeine itself, nor did he seek to use the process commercially to produce decaffeinated coffee.

=== Processes ===
Various methods can be used for decaffeination of coffee. These methods take place prior to roasting and may use organic solvents such as dichloromethane or ethyl acetate, supercritical CO_{2}, or water to extract caffeine from the beans, while leaving flavour precursors in as close to their original state as possible.

==== Organic solvent ====
===== Direct method =====
The first commercially successful decaffeination process was invented by German merchant Ludwig Roselius and co-workers in 1903, after Roselius observed that a consignment of coffee beans accidentally soaked in sea water had lost most of their caffeine content while losing little of their flavour. The process was patented in 1906, and involved steaming coffee beans with various acids or bases, then using benzene as a solvent to remove the caffeine. Coffee decaffeinated this way was sold as Kaffee HAG after the company name Kaffee Handels-Aktien-Gesellschaft (Coffee Trading Company) in most of Europe, as Café Sanka in France and later as Sanka brand coffee in the United States. Café HAG and Sanka are now worldwide brands of Kraft Foods.

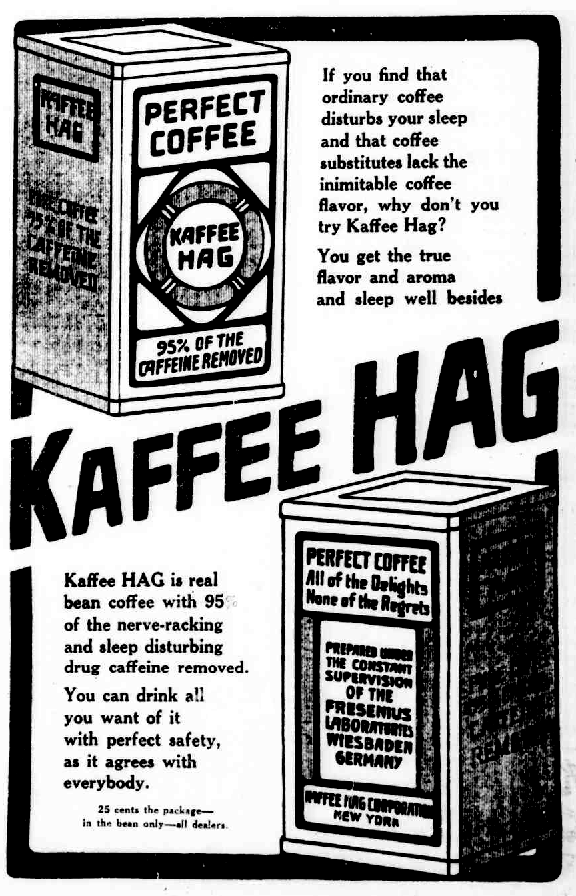
1914 American newspaper advert for Kaffee HAG decaffeinated coffee

Methods similar to those first developed by Roselius have continued to dominate, and are sometimes known as the direct organic solvent method. However, because of health concerns regarding benzene (which is recognized today as a carcinogen), other solvents, such as dichloromethane or ethyl acetate, are now used. The unroasted (green) beans are first steamed and then rinsed with the solvent which extracts the caffeine, while leaving other constituents largely unaffected. The process is repeated between 8 and 12 times until the caffeine content meets the required standard (97% of caffeine removed according to the US standard, or 99.9% caffeine-free by mass per the EU standard).

===== Indirect method =====
Another variation of Roselius' method is the indirect organic solvent method. In this method, instead of treating the beans directly, they are first soaked in hot water for several hours, then removed. The remaining water is treated with solvents (e.g. dichloromethane or ethyl acetate) to extract the caffeine from the water. As in other methods, the caffeine can then be separated from the organic solvent by simple evaporation. The same water is recycled through this two-step process with new batches of beans. An equilibrium is reached after several cycles, wherein the water and the beans have a similar composition except for the caffeine. After this point, the caffeine is the only material removed from the beans, so no coffee strength or other flavorings are lost. Because water is used in the initial phase of this process, indirect method decaffeination is sometimes referred to as "water-processed". This method was first mentioned in 1941, and scientists have made significant efforts to make the process more "natural" and a true water-based process by finding ways to process the caffeine out of the water in ways that circumvent the use of organic solvents.

==== Swiss Water ====
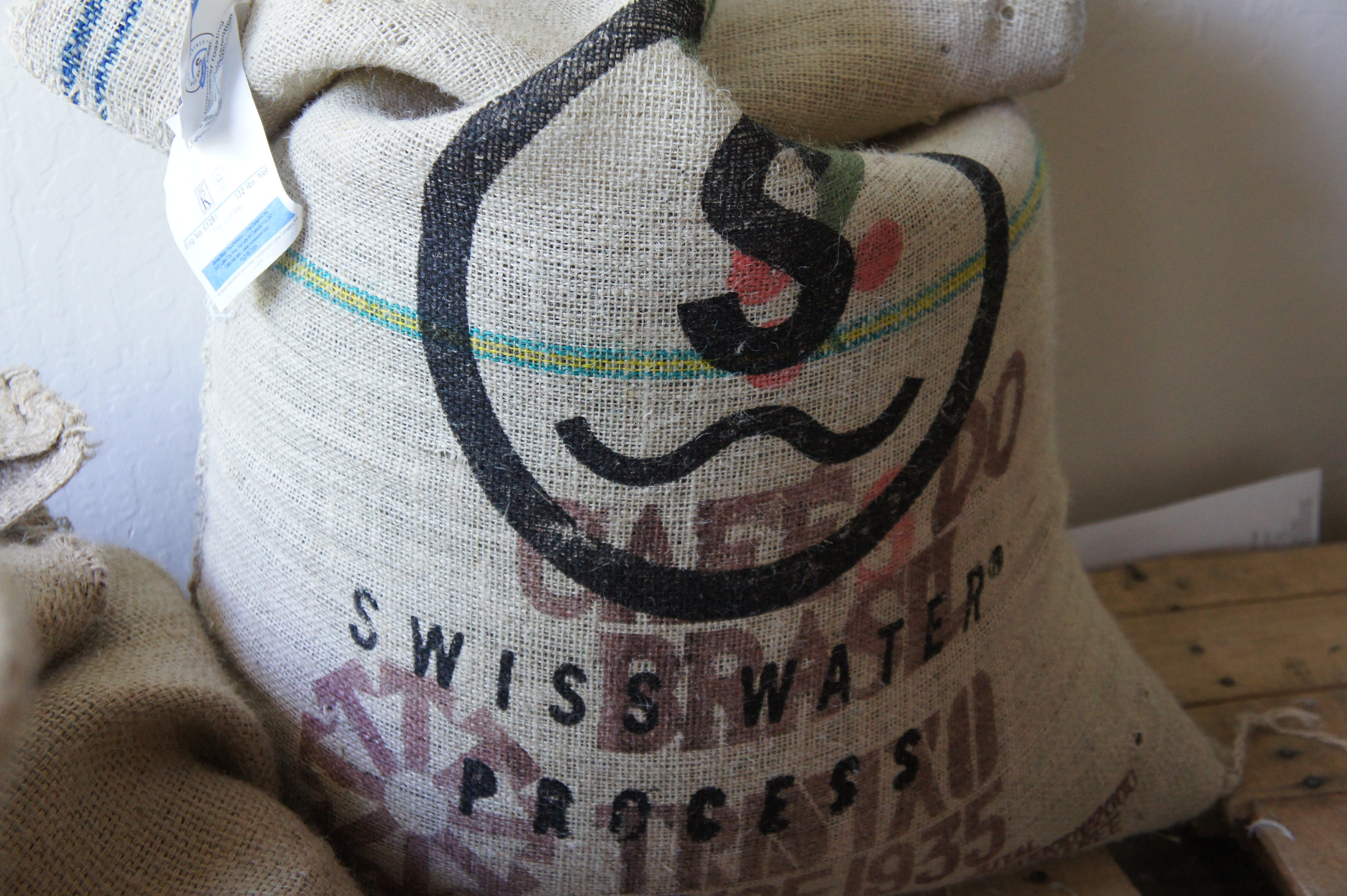
Sack of green coffee beans decaffeinated by the Swiss Water process

An alternative method for removal of caffeine from coffee is the Swiss Water process. This process uses no organic solvents, and instead only water is used to decaffeinate beans. It is a technique first developed in Switzerland in 1933, and commercialized by Coffex S.A. in 1980. The Swiss Water process was then introduced by The Swiss Water Decaffeinated Coffee Company of Burnaby, British Columbia, in 1988.

The process uses green coffee extract (GCE) for the caffeine extraction mechanism. Green coffee extract is a solution containing the water-soluble components of green coffee except for the caffeine, obtained by soaking green coffee beans in hot water, then filtering through an activated charcoal filter to remove the caffeine molecules. Fresh beans containing both caffeine and the other components are added to the GCE solution, where the gradient pressure difference between the GCE (which is caffeine-lean) and the green coffee (which is caffeine-rich) causes the caffeine molecules to migrate from the green coffee into the GCE. Because GCE is saturated with the other water-soluble components of green coffee, only the caffeine molecules migrate to the GCE; the other water-soluble coffee elements are retained in the green coffee. The newly caffeine-rich GCE solution is then passed through the activated carbon filters to remove the caffeine again, and the process is repeated. The continuous batch process takes 8–10 hours to meet the final residual decaffeinated target.

Food engineer Torunn Atteraas Garin also developed a process to remove caffeine from coffee.

==== Triglyceride ====
In this process, green coffee beans are soaked in a hot water and coffee solution to draw the caffeine to the surface of the beans. Next, the beans are transferred to another container and immersed in coffee oils that were obtained from spent coffee grounds and left to soak.

After several hours of high temperatures, the triglycerides in the oils remove the caffeine, but not the flavor elements, from the beans. The beans are separated from the oils and dried. The caffeine is removed from the oils, which are reused to decaffeinate another batch of beans. This is a direct-contact method of decaffeination.

==== Supercritical CO_{2} ====
Food scientists have also turned to supercritical carbon dioxide (sCO_{2}) as a means of decaffeination. Developed by Kurt Zosel, a scientist of the Max Planck Institute, it uses CO_{2} (carbon dioxide), heated and pressurised above its critical point, to extract caffeine. Green coffee beans are steamed and then added to a high pressure vessel. A mixture of water and CO_{2} is circulated through the vessel at 300 atm and 65 °C (149 °F). At this pressure and temperature CO_{2} is a supercritical fluid, with properties midway between a gas and a liquid. Caffeine dissolves into the CO_{2}; but compounds contributing to the flavour of the brewed coffee are largely insoluble in CO_{2} and remain in the bean. In a separate vessel, caffeine is scrubbed from the CO_{2} with additional water. The CO_{2} is then recirculated to the pressure vessel. The purity of the recovered caffeine in this process is above 90%, directly from the process. The biggest industrial plant, which is producing 10,000 tons of decaffeinated coffee per year is currently in operation at Luigi Lavazza S.p.A. in Italy.

=== Caffeine content of coffee ===
According to a 1979 analysis, coffee has the following caffeine content, depending on how it is prepared:

	Serving size	Caffeine content
Brewed	200 mL (7 US fl oz)	80–135 mg
Drip	200 mL (7 US fl oz)	115–175 mg
Espresso	45–60 mL (1 1/2–2 US fl oz)	100 mg

=== Caffeine content of decaffeinated coffee ===
To ensure product quality, manufacturers are required to test the newly decaffeinated coffee beans to make sure that caffeine concentration is relatively low. A caffeine content reduction of at least 97% is required under United States standards. There is less than 0.1% caffeine in decaffeinated coffee and less than 0.3% in decaffeinated instant coffee in Canada. Many coffee companies use high-performance liquid chromatography (HPLC) to measure how much caffeine remains in the coffee beans. However, since HPLC can be quite costly, some coffee companies are beginning to use other methods such as near-infrared (NIR) spectroscopy. Although HPLC is highly accurate, NIR spectroscopy is much faster, cheaper and overall easier to use. Lastly, another method typically used to measure the remaining caffeine includes ultraviolet–visible spectroscopy: useful for decaffeination processes that include supercritical CO_{2}, as CO_{2} does not absorb in the UV-Vis range.

A controlled study in 2006 at Florida State University consisting of ten samples of prepared decaffeinated coffee from coffee shops showed that some caffeine remained. Fourteen to twenty cups of such decaffeinated coffee would contain as much caffeine as one cup of regular coffee. The 473 ml (16 ounce) cups of coffee samples contained caffeine in the range of 8.6 mg to 13.9 mg. In another study of popular brands of decaf coffees, the caffeine content varied from 3 mg to 32 mg. In contrast, a 237 ml (8 ounce) cup of regular coffee contains 95–200 mg of caffeine, and a 355 ml (12 ounce) serving of Coca-Cola contains 36 mg.

== Decaffito ==
As of 2009, progress toward growing coffee beans that do not contain caffeine was still continuing. The term "Decaffito" has been coined to describe this type of coffee, and trademarked in Brazil.

The prospect for Decaffito-type coffees was shown by the discovery of the naturally caffeine-free Coffea charrieriana variety, reported in 2004. It has a deficient caffeine synthase gene, leading it to accumulate theobromine instead of converting it to caffeine. Either this trait could be bred into other coffee plants by crossing them with C. charrieriana, or an equivalent effect could be achieved by knocking out the gene for caffeine synthase in normal coffee plants.

== Decaffeinated tea ==
Tea may also be decaffeinated, usually by using processes analogous to the direct method or the CO_{2} process, as described above. Oxidizing tea leaves to create black tea or oolong tea leaves from green leaves does not affect the amount of caffeine in the tea, though tea-plant subspecies (i.e. Camellia sinensis sinensis vs. Camellia sinensis assamica) may differ in natural caffeine content. Younger leaves and buds contain more caffeine by weight than older leaves and stems. Although the CO_{2} process is favorable because it is convenient, nonexplosive, and nontoxic, a comparison between regular and decaffeinated green teas using supercritical carbon dioxide showed that most volatile, nonpolar compounds (such as linalool and phenylacetaldehyde), green and floral flavor compounds (such as hexanal and (E)-2-hexenal), and some unknown compounds disappeared or decreased after decaffeination.

In addition to CO_{2} process extraction, tea may be also decaffeinated using a hot water treatment. Optimal conditions are met by controlling water temperature, extraction time, and ratio of leaf to water. Temperatures of 100 °C or more, moderate extraction time of 3 minutes, and a 1:20 leaf to water weight per volume ratio removed 83% caffeine content and preserved 95% of total catechins. Catechins, a type of flavanol, contribute to the flavor of the tea and have been shown to increase the suppression of mutagens that may lead to cancer.

Both coffee and tea have tannins, which are responsible for their astringent taste, but tea has around one third of the tannin content of coffee. Thus, decaffeination of tea requires more care to maintain tannin content than decaffeination of coffee in order to preserve this flavor. Preserving tannins is desirable not only because of their flavor, but also because they have been shown to have anticarcinogenic, antimutagenic, antioxidative, and antimicrobial properties. Specifically, tannins accelerate blood clotting, reduce blood pressure, decrease the serum lipid level, and modulate immunoresponses.

Certain processes during normal production might help to decrease the caffeine content directly, or simply lower the rate at which it is released throughout each infusion. In China, this is evident in many cooked pu-erh teas, as well as more heavily fired Wuyi Mountain oolongs; commonly referred to as 'zhonghuo' (mid-fired) or 'zuhuo' (high-fired).

A generally accepted statistic is that a cup of normal black (or red) tea contains 40–50 mg of caffeine, roughly half the content of a cup of coffee.

Although a common technique of discarding a short (30 to 60 seconds) steep is believed to much reduce caffeine content of a subsequent brew at the cost of some loss of flavor, research suggests that a five-minute steep yields up to 70% of the caffeine, and a second steep has one-third the caffeine of the first (about 23% of the total caffeine in the leaves).

== See also ==
- Caffeine-Free Coca-Cola
- Caffeine-Free Pepsi
- Coffee substitute
- Health effects of caffeine
- Health effects of coffee
- Health effects of tea
- Low caffeine coffee
