= Coffea affinis =

Scientific classification
- Kingdom: Plantae
- Clade: Tracheophytes
- Clade: Angiosperms
- Clade: Eudicots
- Clade: Asterids
- Order: Gentianales
- Family: Rubiaceae
- Genus: Coffea
- Species: C. affinis

Binomial name
- Coffea affinis De Wild.

Synonyms
- Coffea stenophylla var. camaya Portères

Species of plant

Coffea affinis is a species of plant from the family Rubiaceae. It is a largely unknown coffee bean found in West Africa.

== See also ==
- Coffea
- Coffee
