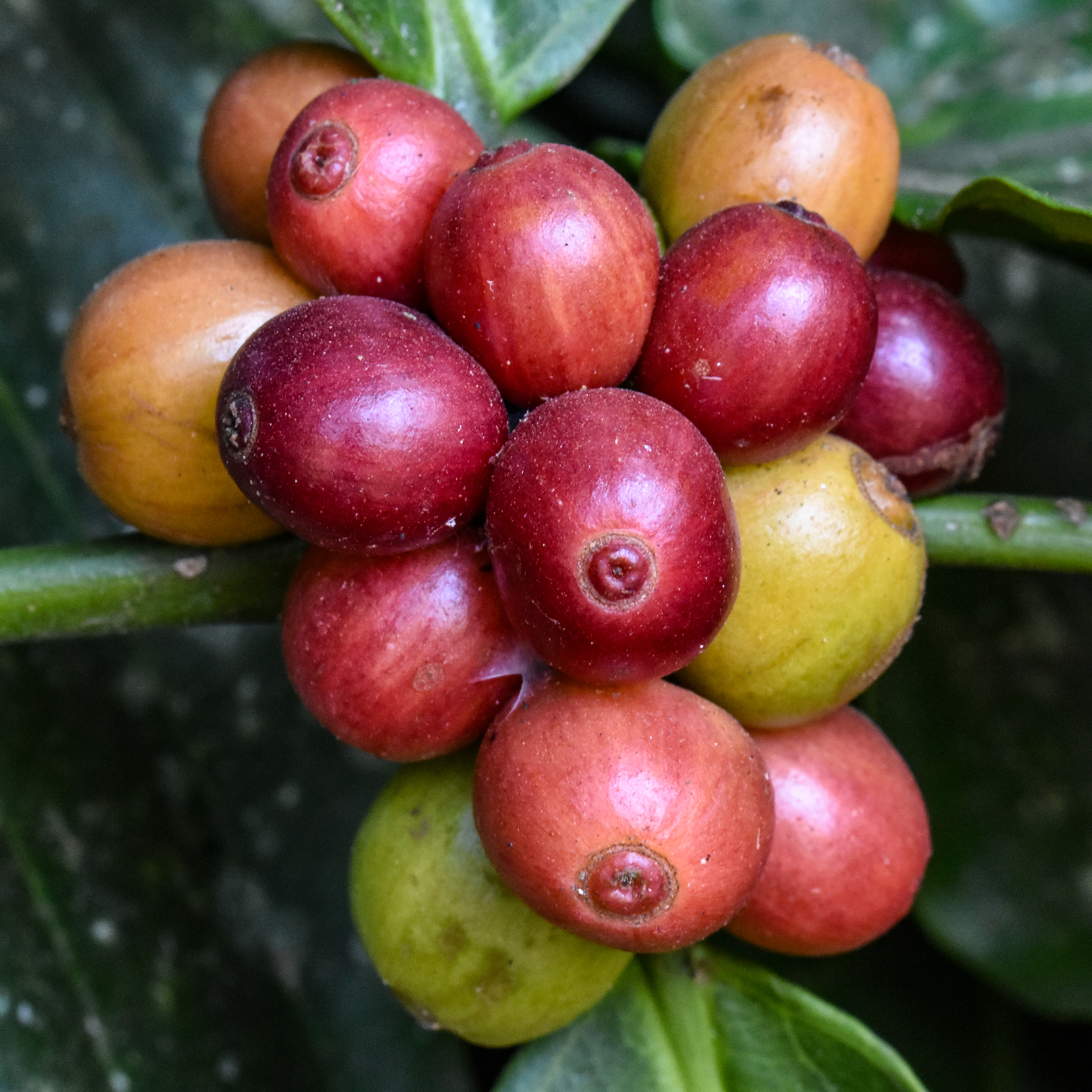
- Berries of Coffea canephora

Conservation status
- Least Concern (IUCN 3.1)

Scientific classification
- Kingdom: Plantae
- Clade: Tracheophytes
- Clade: Angiosperms
- Clade: Eudicots
- Clade: Asterids
- Order: Gentianales
- Family: Rubiaceae
- Genus: Coffea
- Species: C. canephora

Binomial name
- Coffea canephora Pierre ex A.Froehner

Synonyms
- Coffea robusta L.Linden

= Coffea canephora =

Species of coffee plant

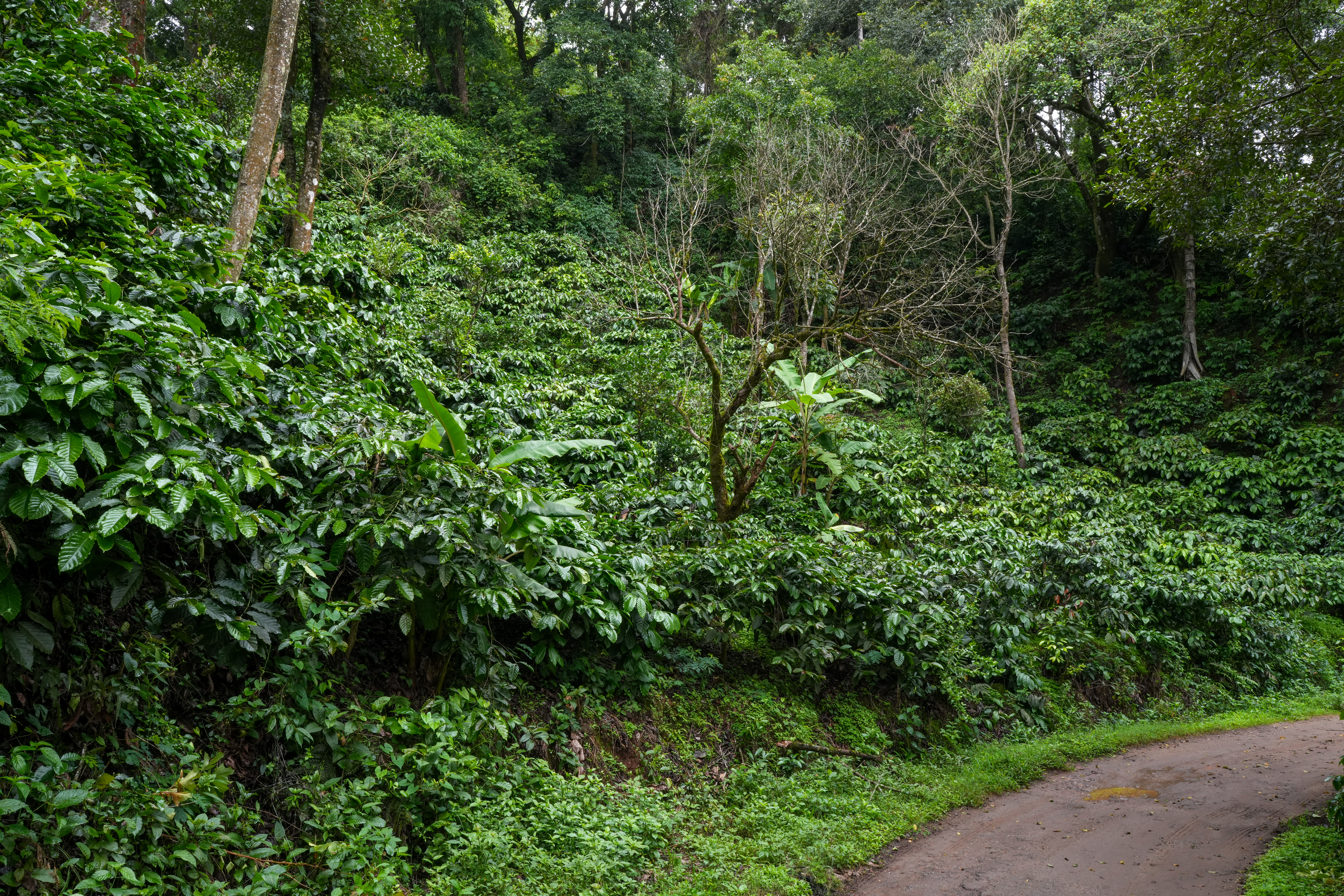
Field of robusta bushes, Kodagu

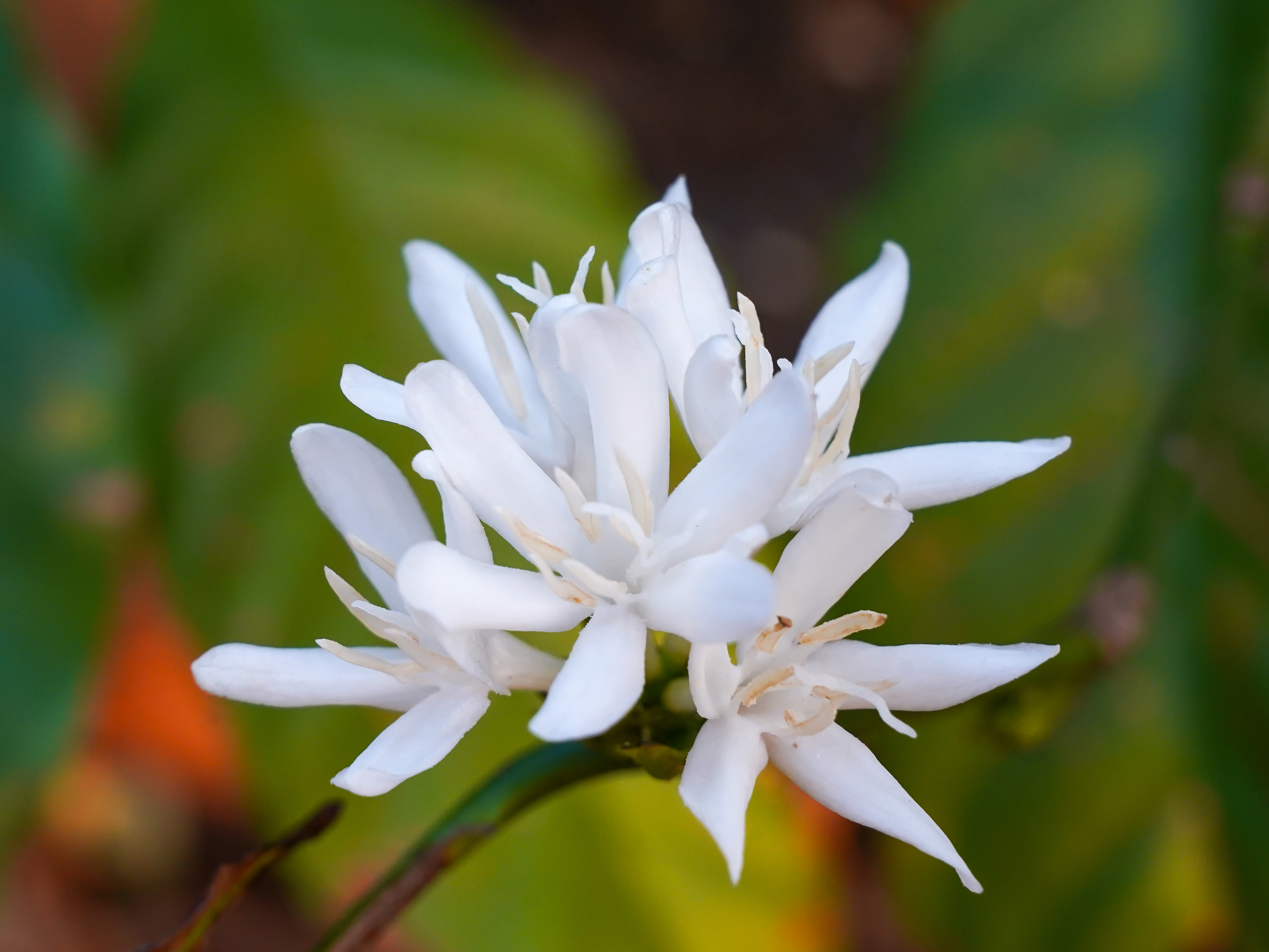
Flowers close-up

Coffea canephora (especially C. canephora subvar. robusta, syn. Coffea robusta, or commonly robusta coffee) is a species of coffee plant that has its origins in central and western sub-Saharan Africa. It is a species of flowering plant in the family Rubiaceae. Though widely known as Coffea robusta, the plant is scientifically identified as Coffea canephora, which has two main varieties, robusta and nganda (nom. illeg.).

Coffea canephora represents around 45% of global coffee production, with Coffea arabica constituting most of the remainder. There are several differences between the composition of coffee beans from C. arabica and C. canephora. Beans from C. canephora tend to have lower acidity, more bitterness, and a more woody and less fruity flavor compared to C. arabica beans. Most of it is used for instant coffee.

== Taxonomy ==
Though widely known by the synonym Coffea robusta, the plant is currently scientifically identified as Coffea canephora, which has two main varieties, C. canephora var. robusta and C. canephora var. nganda (nom. illeg.). It was not recognized as a species of Coffea until 1897, over a hundred years after Coffea arabica.

== Description ==
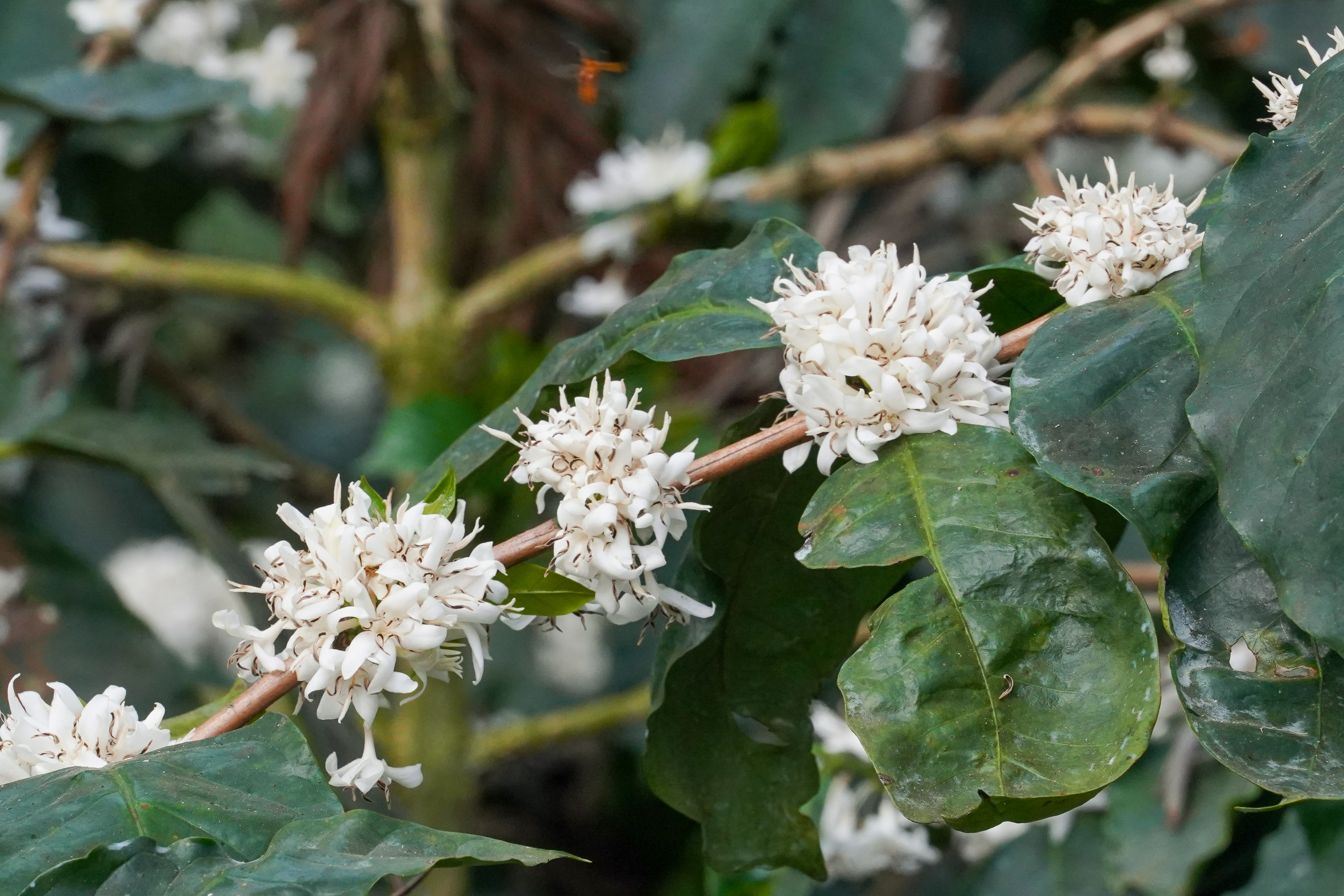
Clusters of robusta coffee flowers

Robusta is a species of flowering plant in the family Rubiaceae. The plant has a shallow root system and grows as a robust tree or shrub to about 10 metres (30 feet) tall. It flowers irregularly, taking about 10–11 months for the berries to ripen, producing oval-shaped beans. C. canephora contains a range of bioactive compounds including caffeine, and polyphenols, which both contribute to its physiological and ecological functions.

The robusta plant has a greater crop yield than that of arabica, contains more caffeine (2.7% compared to arabica's 1.5%), and contains less sugar (3–7% compared to arabica's 6–9%). As it is less susceptible to pests and disease, robusta needs much less herbicide and pesticide than arabica. C. canephora exhibits substantial genetic and morphological diversity across its cultivated and wild populations.

== Native distribution ==
C. canephora grows indigenously in Western and Central Africa from Liberia to Tanzania and south to Angola.

== Naturalization ==
Coffee cultivation led to robusta seeds spreading out of Africa and becoming naturalized in Borneo, French Polynesia, Costa Rica, Nicaragua, Jamaica and the Lesser Antilles. In 1927 a hybrid between robusta and arabica was found in Timor. This strain was subsequently used to breed coffee rust-resistant plants.

== Cultivation and use ==
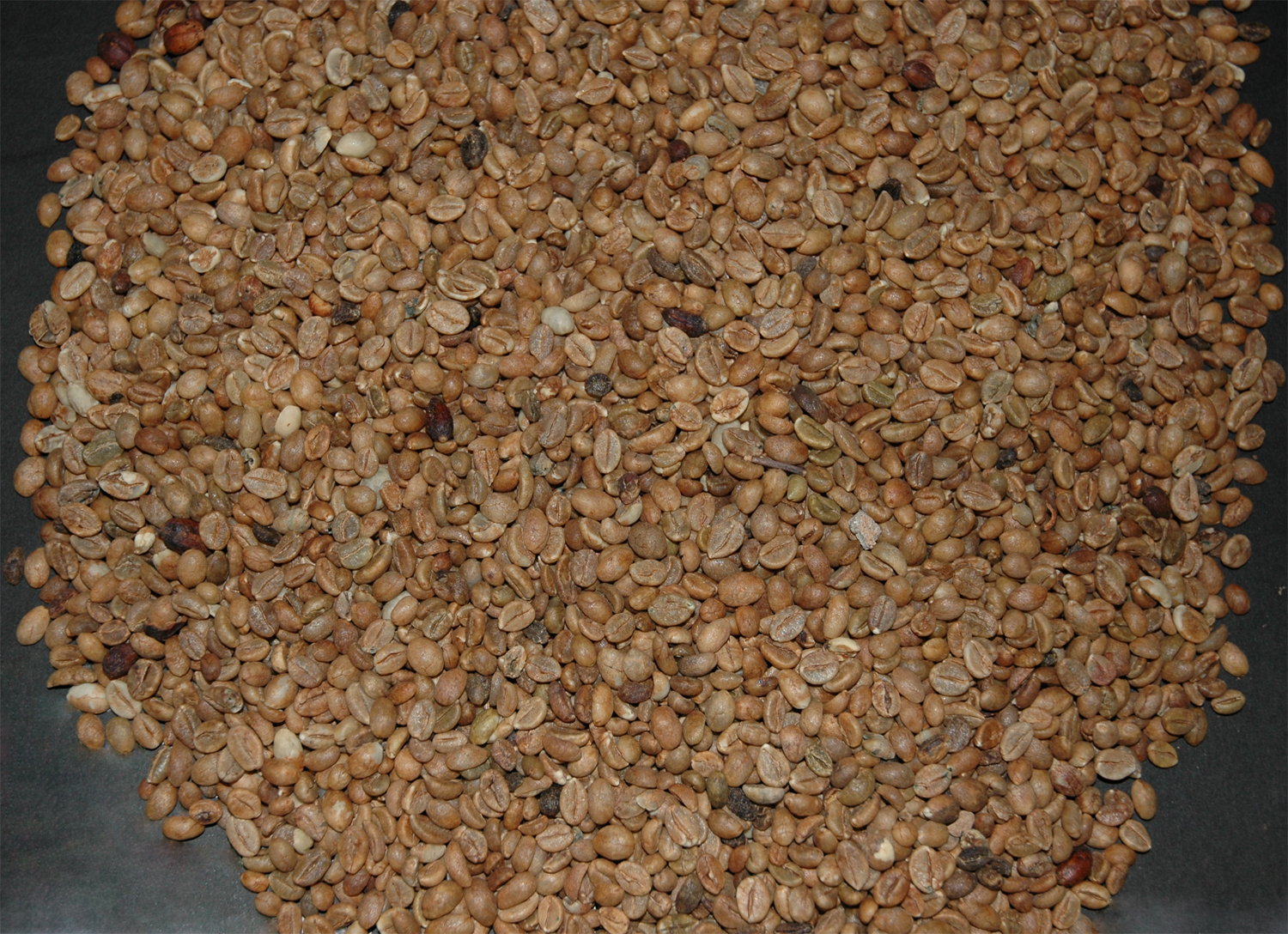
Unroasted robusta beans

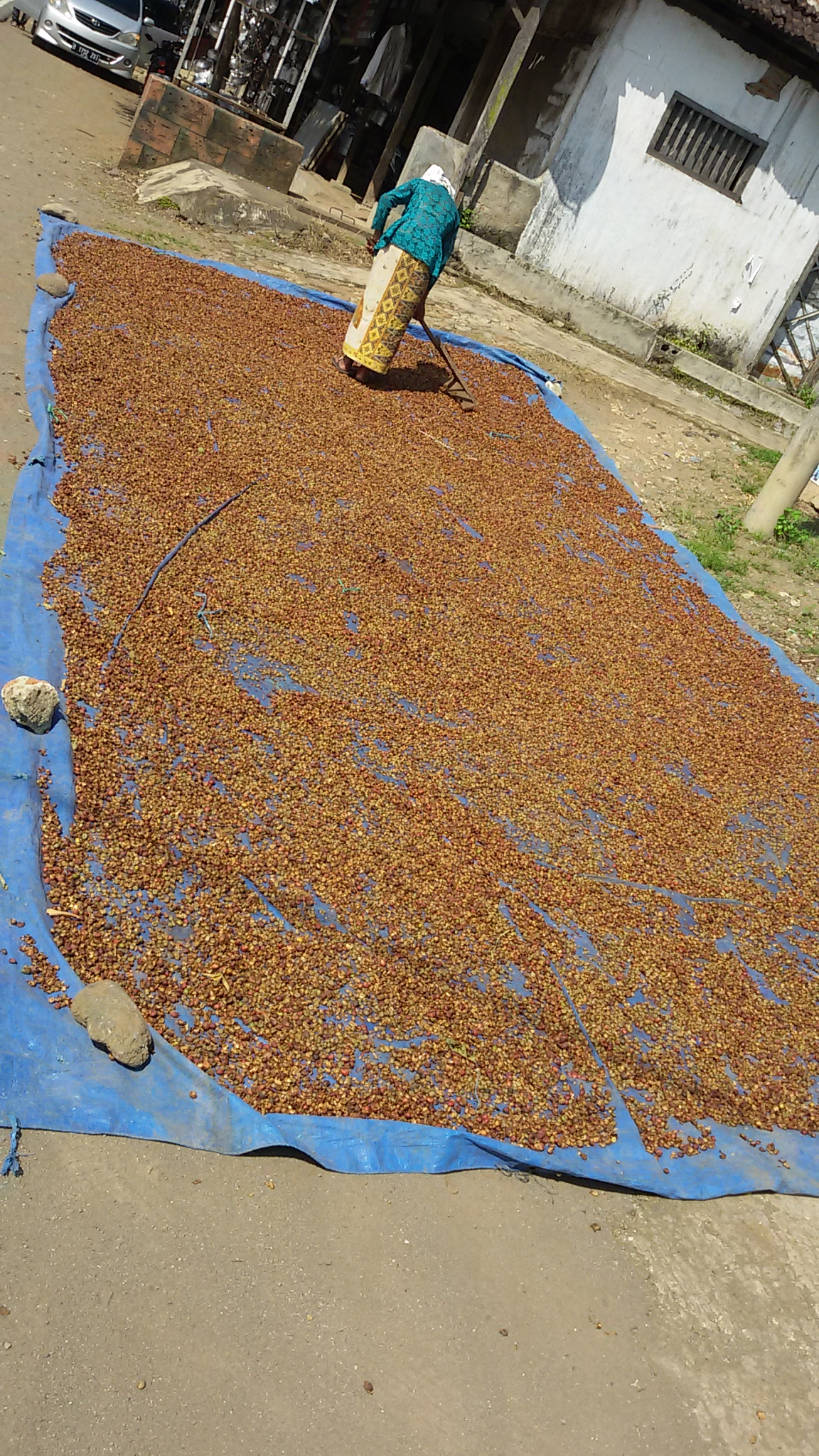
Traditional drying of coffee beans in Kalibaru, Indonesia

Robusta has its origins in central and western sub-Saharan Africa. It is easy to care for, has a greater crop yield, has almost double the amount of caffeine and more antioxidants, and is less susceptible to disease than arabica coffea. It represents 46% of global coffee production, with arabica constituting the remainder except for the 1.5% constituted by Coffea liberica. Microbial communities associated with C. canephora roots and fruits can influence plant health and its overall productivity.

It is mostly grown in Vietnam, where French colonists introduced it in the late 19th century, though it is also grown in India, Africa, and in Brazil, where the conilon variety is widely grown. In recent years, Vietnam, which produces mostly robusta, has become the world's largest exporter of robusta coffee, accounting for over 40% of the total production. It surpasses Brazil (25% of the world's production), Indonesia (13%), India (5%), and Uganda (5%). Brazil is still the biggest coffee producer in the world, producing one-third of the world's coffee, though 69% of that is C. arabica. The species demonstrates high adaptability to diverse environmental conditions, partly due to its ability to change its behaviour and morphology.

Since Robusta is easier to care for and has a greater crop yield than C. arabica, it is cheaper to produce. Roasted robusta beans produce a strong, full-bodied coffee with a distinctive earthy flavour, but usually with more bitterness than arabica due to its pyrazine content. Since arabica beans are presumed to have smoother taste with more acidity and a richer flavour, they are often considered superior, while the harsher robusta beans are mostly used as a filler in lower-grade coffee blends. However, the powerful flavour can be desirable in a blend to give it perceived "strength" and "finish", notably in Italian coffee culture. Good-quality robusta beans are used in traditional Italian espresso blends to provide a full-bodied taste and a better foam head (known as crema).

== See also ==
- Coffea arabica
- Coffea charrieriana
