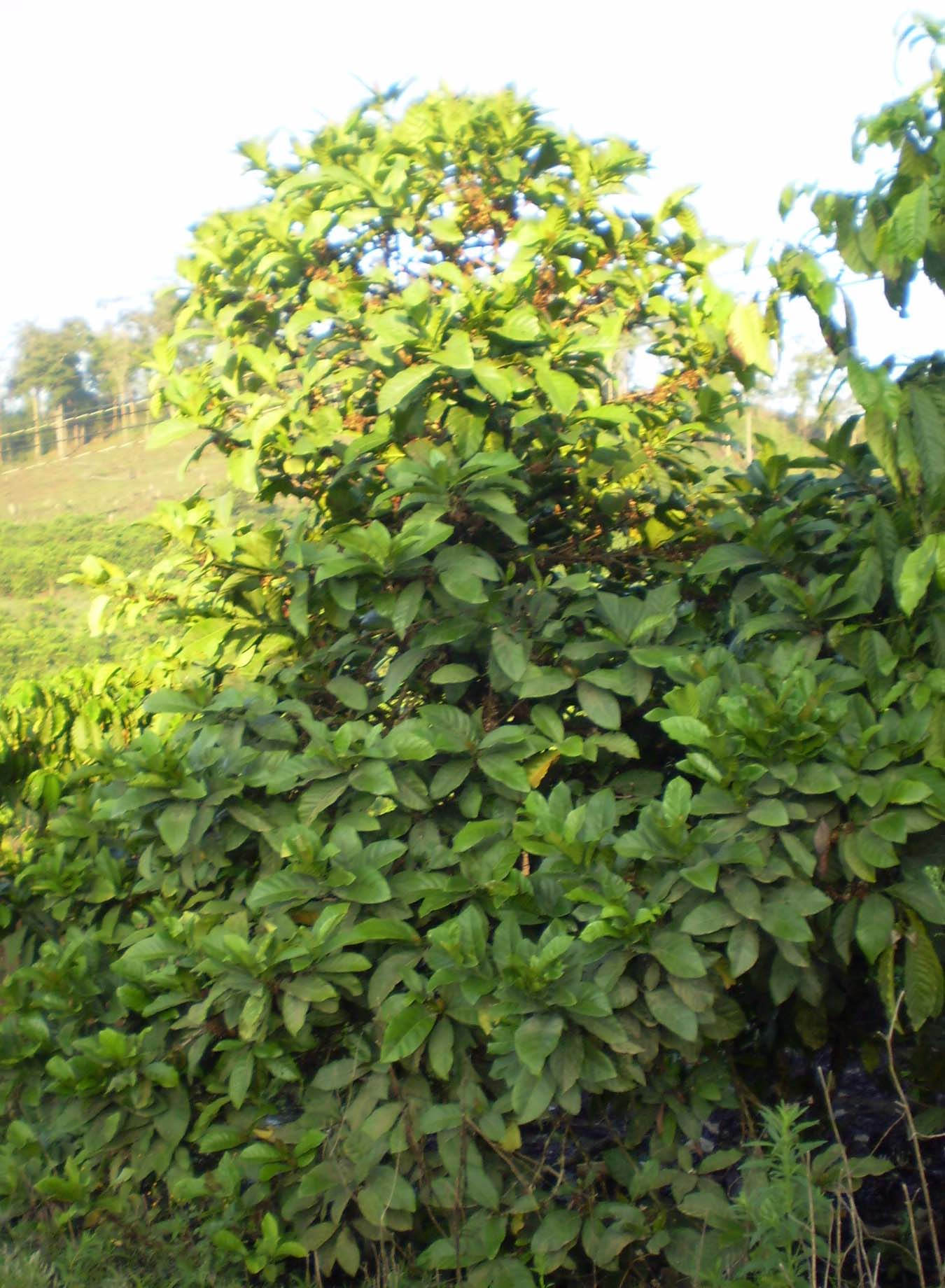
- C. liberica tree in Vietnam
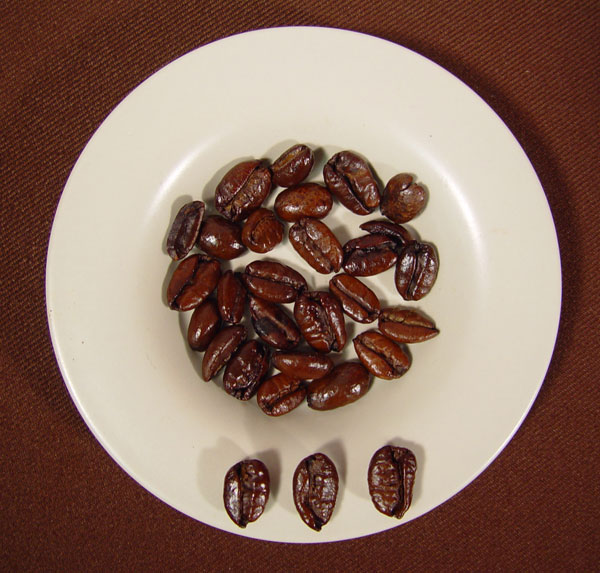
- Roasted C. liberica beans from the Philippines, where they are known as "kapeng barako"

Conservation status
- Least Concern (IUCN 3.1)

Scientific classification
- Kingdom: Plantae
- Clade: Tracheophytes
- Clade: Angiosperms
- Clade: Eudicots
- Clade: Asterids
- Order: Gentianales
- Family: Rubiaceae
- Genus: Coffea
- Species: C. liberica

Binomial name
- Coffea liberica W.Bull

Synonyms
- 18 synonyms: Coffea abeokutae Cramer; Coffea abeokutae var. camerunensis A.Chev.; Coffea abeokutae var. indeniensis (Siebert) A.Chev.; Coffea abeokutae var. longicarpa Portères; Coffea abeokutae var. macrocarpa A.Chev.; Coffea abeokutae var. microcarpa A.Chev.; Coffea abeokutae var. sphaerocarpa Portères; Coffea excelsoidea Portères ex A.Chev.; Coffea liberica var. aurantiaca A.Chev.; Coffea liberica f. bwambensis Bridson; Coffea liberica var. gossweileri A.Chev.; Coffea liberica var. grandifolia A.Chev.; Coffea liberica var. indeniensis E.Siebert; Coffea liberica var. ivorensis E.Siebert; Coffea liberica var. liberica; Coffea liberica var. liberiensis E.Siebert; Coffea liberica var. pyriformis Fauchère; Coffea oyemensis A.Chev.

= Coffea liberica =

Species of coffee plant

Coffea liberica, commonly known as Liberian coffee, is a species of flowering plant in the family Rubiaceae from which coffee is produced. It is native to western and central Africa (from Liberia to Uganda and Angola), and has become naturalised in areas including Colombia, Venezuela, the Philippines, Sumatra, Borneo and Java.

== Description ==
Coffea liberica trees are very tall, reaching up to 20 m (66 ft) high, and are harvested using ladders. The cherries, beans, and leaves are also among the largest of all coffee varieties.

The shape of the liberica beans is unique among commercial species of coffee, which also include Arabica and Robusta. It is asymmetric, with one side shorter than the other, creating a characteristic "hook" at the tip. The central furrow is also more jagged than other coffee beans.

== Characteristics ==
Coffea liberica produces markedly larger seeds than Arabica and Robusta. Beans measured in Selangor, Malaysia, reached lengths of about 12 mm, and 100 beans weighed 23.20–25.72 g, close to double the mass of 100 Arabica beans.

Its sensory profile is distinct from that of Arabica and Robusta, characterized by fruity, jackfruit-like aromas, moderate acidity and a relatively full body. Roast level has a strong effect on the cup: light to medium roasts express the jackfruit and fruity notes most clearly, medium roasting brings out caramel and chocolate attributes, and darker roasts increase bitterness and astringency while partly masking the fruity character.

== Cultivation and use ==
Coffea liberica accounts for less than 1.5% of commercial coffee grown. It was first commercially cultivated in the Philippines, after it was brought to the city of Lipa in the 1740s by Spanish friars. C. liberica was the main coffee species grown in the islands during the colonial period. They were exported to Western countries where they would command prices of up to five times the prices of coffee beans from other species. During the worldwide pandemic of coffee rust in the late 19th century, C. liberica plantations in the Philippines survived longer than Arabica and Robusta plantations. But they too eventually succumbed to the disease, leading to the collapse of the coffee industry in the islands. C. liberica is locally known as kapeng barako (Spanish: café verraco). It is highly regarded and grown widely in the Philippines, though largely only for the local market. Batangas and the neighboring province of Cavite are the main producers of the Philippine varietal of liberica.

At the end of the 19th century, C. liberica was also brought to Indonesia to replace the Arabica trees killed by the coffee rust disease. It is cultivated in Java and West Kalimantan, and in Malaysia, where Johor is a major production centre.

By the late 19th century, exports of coffee from Liberia increased substantially. Demand for Liberian coffee in the United States increased after it was showcased at the Centennial Exposition in 1876.

Liberica coffee beans are much larger than the more popular Arabica and Robusta beans. Due to its rarity and limited supply on a global level, the cost of regular liberica beans is on the higher end, with premium liberica beans carrying a heavier price tag. Caffeine content in green liberica beans varies widely, with reported values ranging from about 1.2 to 3.8 g/100 g on a dry basis. The species occupies an intermediate position among the three commercial coffees, generally lower in caffeine than Robusta and overlapping with or slightly exceeding Arabica. One analysis of Malaysian samples measured 1.23 g/100 g in liberica, against 1.61 g/100 g for Arabica and 2.26 g/100 g for Robusta.

C. liberica has gained renewed attention for its ability to grow in acidic peat soils, where Arabica and Robusta typically fail. In the Indonesian provinces of Sumatra, specifically Jambi, and in West Kalimantan, it is increasingly used as an alternative crop to more damaging land uses on peatland. Because it still requires drainage, C. liberica is classified as a transitional crop on drained peat rather than a true paludiculture species, which requires undrained, waterlogged conditions. By keeping drainage shallower than under typical oil palm cultivation while still generating income, C. liberica contributes to a reduction, though not elimination, of carbon emissions and peat subsidence.

== Taxonomy ==
Coffea dewevrei, Coffea dybowskii and Coffea excelsa were formerly considered as separate species but were reclassified in 2006 as synonyms for Coffea liberica var. dewevrei. A 2025 analysis of genomic, morphological and distributional data instead divided C. liberica into three species: C. liberica in upper West Africa, C. dewevrei (excelsa coffee) in Central Africa, and C. klainei in west-central Africa. A 2026 genomic study confirmed hybridisation between C. liberica and C. dewevrei in cultivated material, the wild ranges of the two species being separate, and proposed the formal name Coffea × libex for the hybrid, with a suggested admixture threshold of 10% for its recognition; admixture was most pronounced among cultivated plants from Sarawak, Malaysia.

== See also ==
- Coffea
