= Maracaturra coffee =

Variety of coffee plant

Maracaturra is a high yielding Brazilian hybrid of Maragogype and Caturra. It is believed to have naturally occurred in the late 1800s and is mainly found in Brazil, El Salvador, and Nicaragua. They have large sized beans and leaves. Its Caturra lineage contributes to the coffee's taste and its high yield. It has short stature and abundant foliage, making it resistant to wind damage.

This variety is susceptible to coffee leaf rust and hence demands a high level of maintenance. Its flavor profile includes tropical fruits and bright acidity. It is cultivated in areas which are 1400 to 1600 meters above sea level.

The variety came fifth in the Cup of Excellence 2015.
