= Bourbon coffee =

Variety of coffee plant

Coffee Variety Information
- Stature: Tall
- Leaf Tip Color: Green
- Bean Size: Average
- Quality Potential: Very Good
- Yield Potential: Medium
- Coffee Leaf Rust: Susceptible
- Coffee Berry Disease (CBD): Susceptible
- Nematodes: Susceptible

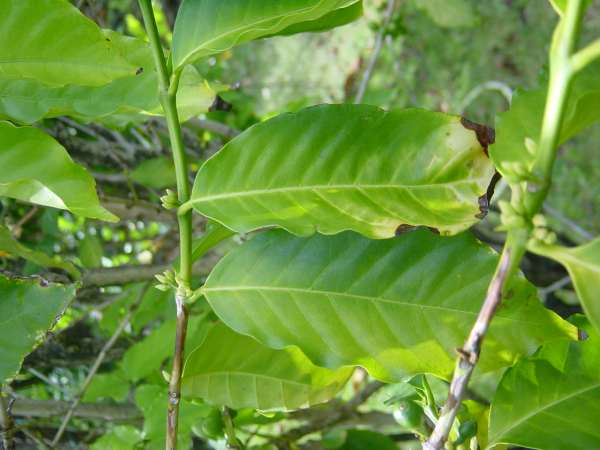
Leaves of a bourbon coffee tree native to Reunion Island

Bourbon is a cultivar of Coffea arabica. It is one of the two main varietals from which many new cultivars are bred, the other being Typica. Both originated in Yemen.

Bourbon coffee was first produced in Réunion island, known as Île Bourbon before 1789. The French later took it to mainland Africa and Latin America.

Bourbon grows best at elevations between 1,100 and 2,000 meters (3,600 and 6,600 ft) and gives a 20–30% higher yield than Typica, but produces a similar quality of coffee. Bourbon has a commercially viable yield potential and growth habit but is susceptible to disease and pests. Bourbon quality is generally accepted to be standard to good. The tree can grow tall and has a medium yield potential of very good quality cherries. It is susceptible to the major diseases of coffee.

== Description ==
Young leaves are green, and mature leaves are generally larger than Typica leaves. Plagiotropic (secondary) branches grow at a slight angle, roughly 60° from the main (orthotropic) stem. Bourbon cherries are generally more round than Typica cherries. Bourbon accessions from Yemen tend to have a single main stem (monocauly) whereas accessions from Ethiopia tend to form multiple branches.

== See also ==
- List of coffee varieties
