= Giling Basah =

Indonesian term for traditional coffee processors

Giling Basah is a term used by Indonesian coffee processors to describe the method they use to remove the hulls of Coffea arabica and Coffea robusta. Literally translated from Indonesian, the term means "wet grinding".

The coffee industry also uses the term "wet hulled" to describe the same process.

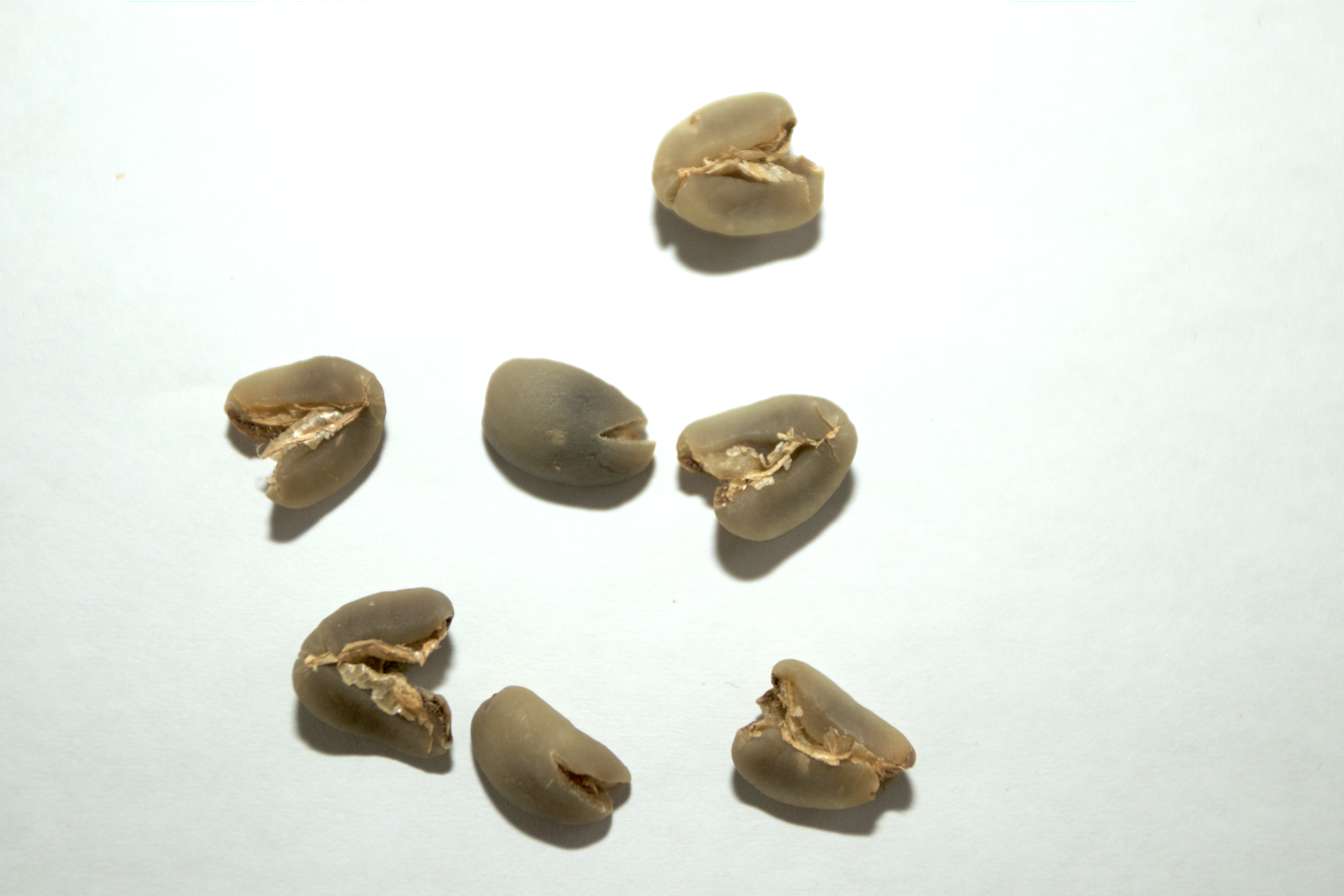
Kuku kambing, or "goat's foot" defect caused by wet hulling.

Most small-scale farmers in Sumatra, Sulawesi, Flores and Papua use the Giling Basah process. The mature coffee fruit, referred to as the coffee cherry, is harvested. This method is a pragmatic response to the region's humid, rainy climate, which makes it impractical to dry the coffee using more traditional methods that require weeks of consistent sun. Farmers remove the outer skin mechanically using locally built pulping machines. The coffee beans, coated with mucilage, are stored for up to a day during which a natural fermentation breaks down the sticky residue. Afterwards the coffee beans, protected by a parchment hull (endocarp) are washed off before being let out to dry.

Contrary to other traditional drying methods, where the parchment coffee is dried until it reaches about 12% moisture content, the beans in the Giling Basah process are hulled when they reach between 30 and 35% moisture content; still semi-wet. The green coffee beans are then further dried to reach the exportable 12% moisture content. This operation gives the beans a unique bluish-green appearance and is thought to reduce the acidity and increase the body, resulting in the classic Indonesian cup profile. The Giling Basah process also introduces additional flavors that can be vegetal or herbal, woody or musty, sometimes earthy.

The Giling Basah process sometimes creates a "goat's foot," a split on one end, in green coffee beans. This happens when the hulling machine partially crushes a soft bean, giving the bean a shape resembling a cloven hoof.

== See also ==
- Coffee production in Indonesia
