= Mandheling =

Mandheling can mean two things:

- It is an alternative spelling of the name Mandailing, an ethnic group from Sumatra, Indonesia
- It is the name of a coffee variety from Sumatra
