= S795 coffee =

Variety of coffee plant

S795 Coffee
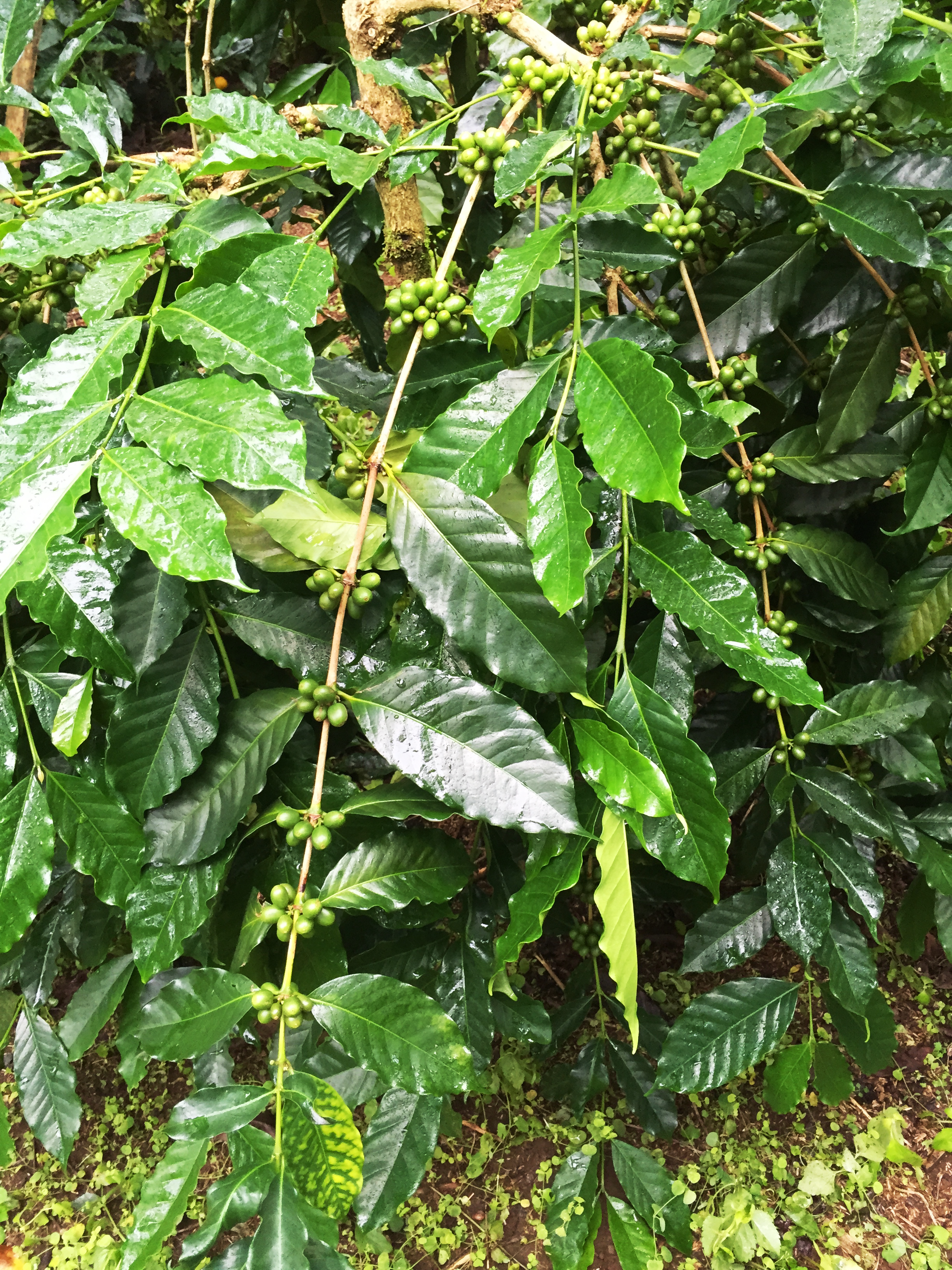
- A branch of S795 coffee
- Genus: Coffea
- Species: C. arabica
- Hybrid parentage: S288 x Kent
- Breeder: Balehonnur Coffee Research Station
- Origin: India

S795 (Selection-795) is a coffee cultivar important for being one of the first strains of C. arabica found to be resistant to coffee leaf rust (CLR).

It is a selection of the Balehonnur Coffee Research Station in India, and it was generated by R.L. Narasimhaswamy by cross-breeding C. arabica and C. liberica known as S288 and the Kent variety, a hybrid of Typica and an unknown other type. Both S288 and Kent are resistant to many rust races, and the Kent variety is a high-yielding tree. The resultant S795 cultivar exhibits rust resistance, high yield, and a good cup profile, making it a desirable cultivar for producers.

S795 is widely planted in India and Indonesia. It represents 25-30% of the acreage of arabica coffee in India.

== Description ==
S795 is a tall and vigorous shrub producing a high number of primary and secondary plagiotropic branches. The fruit (cherries) are medium in size and oblong in shape and progress from green when young to dark red when ripe. Each node produces around 14 - 16 cherries. New leaves are a light bronze color

In 2021, twelve of the top 26 coffees in Indonesia's first Cup of Excellence competition either contained S795 as part of a blend or were solely S795.

== See also ==
- List of coffee varieties
