= Penicillium coffeae =

Scientific classification
- Domain: Eukaryota
- Kingdom: Fungi
- Division: Ascomycota
- Class: Eurotiomycetes
- Order: Eurotiales
- Family: Aspergillaceae
- Genus: Penicillium
- Species: P. coffeae

Binomial name
- Penicillium coffeae S.W. Peterson, F.E. Vega, Posada & Nagai 2005

Species of fungus

Penicillium coffeae is a fungus species of the genus of Penicillium which was isolated from the plant Coffea arabica L. in Hawaii. Insects play a role in spreading Penicillium coffeae.

== See also ==
- List of Penicillium species
