= Penicillium tropicum =

Scientific classification
- Kingdom: Fungi
- Division: Ascomycota
- Class: Eurotiomycetes
- Order: Eurotiales
- Family: Aspergillaceae
- Genus: Penicillium
- Species: P. tropicum

Binomial name
- Penicillium tropicum Houbraken, J.A.M.P.; Frisvad, J.C.; Samson, R.A. 2010

Type strain
- CBS 112584

Synonyms
- Eupenicillium tropicum

Species of fungus

Penicillium tropicum is a species of fungus in the genus Penicillium which was isolated from soil beneath a Coffea arabica plant in Karnataka in India.
