= Maragogipe Coffee =

Variety of coffee plant

Coffee Variety Information
- Stature: Tall
- Leaf Tip Color: Bronze
- Bean Size: Very Large
- Quality Potential: Very Good
- Yield Potential: Low
- Coffee Leaf Rust: Susceptible
- Coffee Berry Disease (CBD): Susceptible
- Nematodes: Susceptible

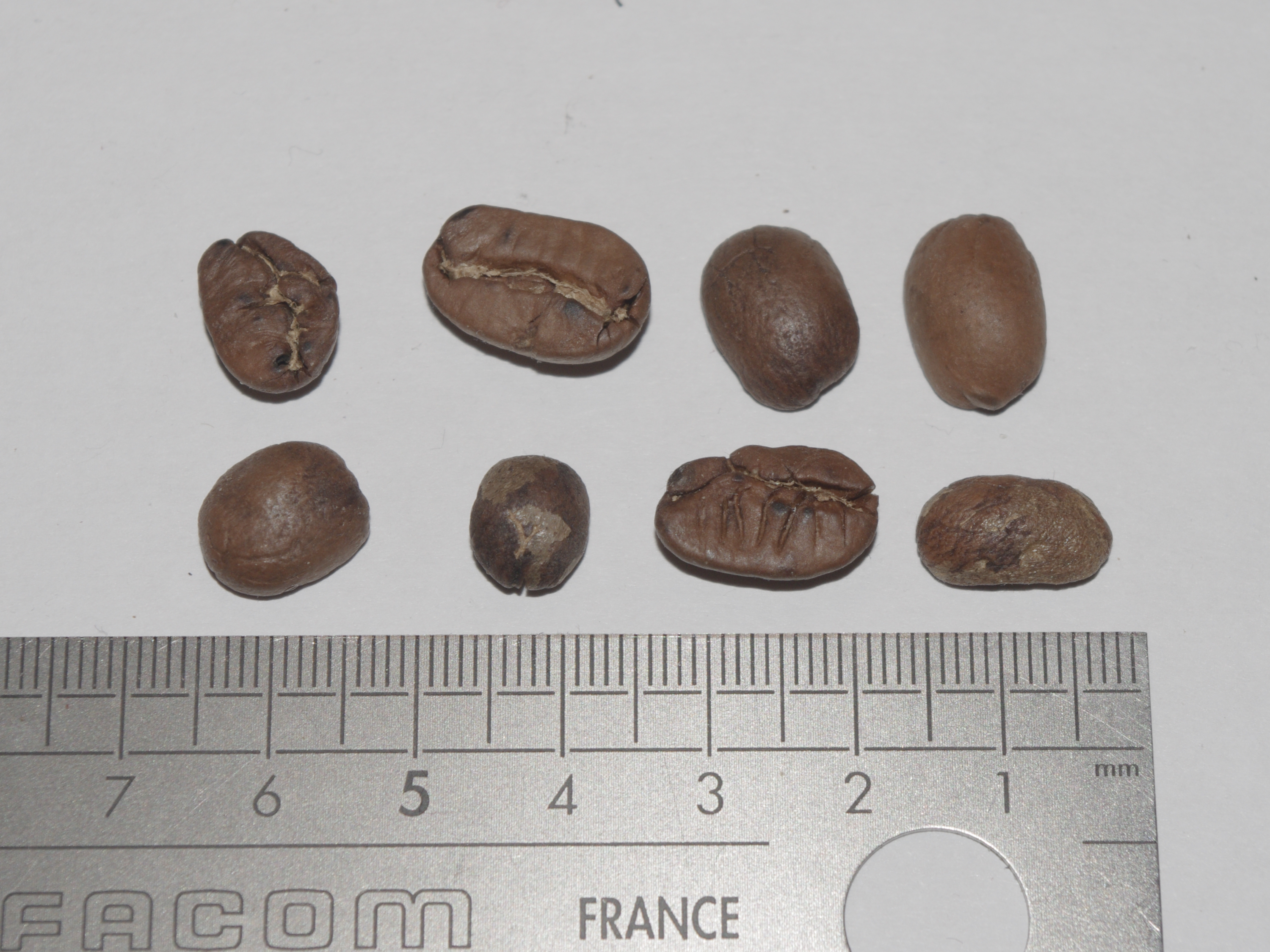
Maragogipe beans from Nicaragua, medium roast

Scientific name: Coffea arabica L var. maragogipe A. Fern. Ex A. Frohner

Maragogipe is a variety of Arabica coffee, also known as "elephant coffee beans". It is believed that this coffee is a spontaneous mutation of Typica coffee that happened in Maragogipe, Bahia in Brazil. This is a very large size coffee bean in comparison to other Arabica coffee beans.

Maragogipe coffee's flavor varies depending on the soil where it grows. Poor soils produce a coffee with diminished flavors. That is why it is often referred to as a coffee with "not much flavor", but the flavor can be enhanced by allowing these coffee beans to dry with its natural sugars.

Maragogipe is a rarity in the coffee world and it is appreciated by coffee aficionados.

== See also ==
- List of coffee varieties
- Coffee production in Brazil
