= List of coffee varieties =

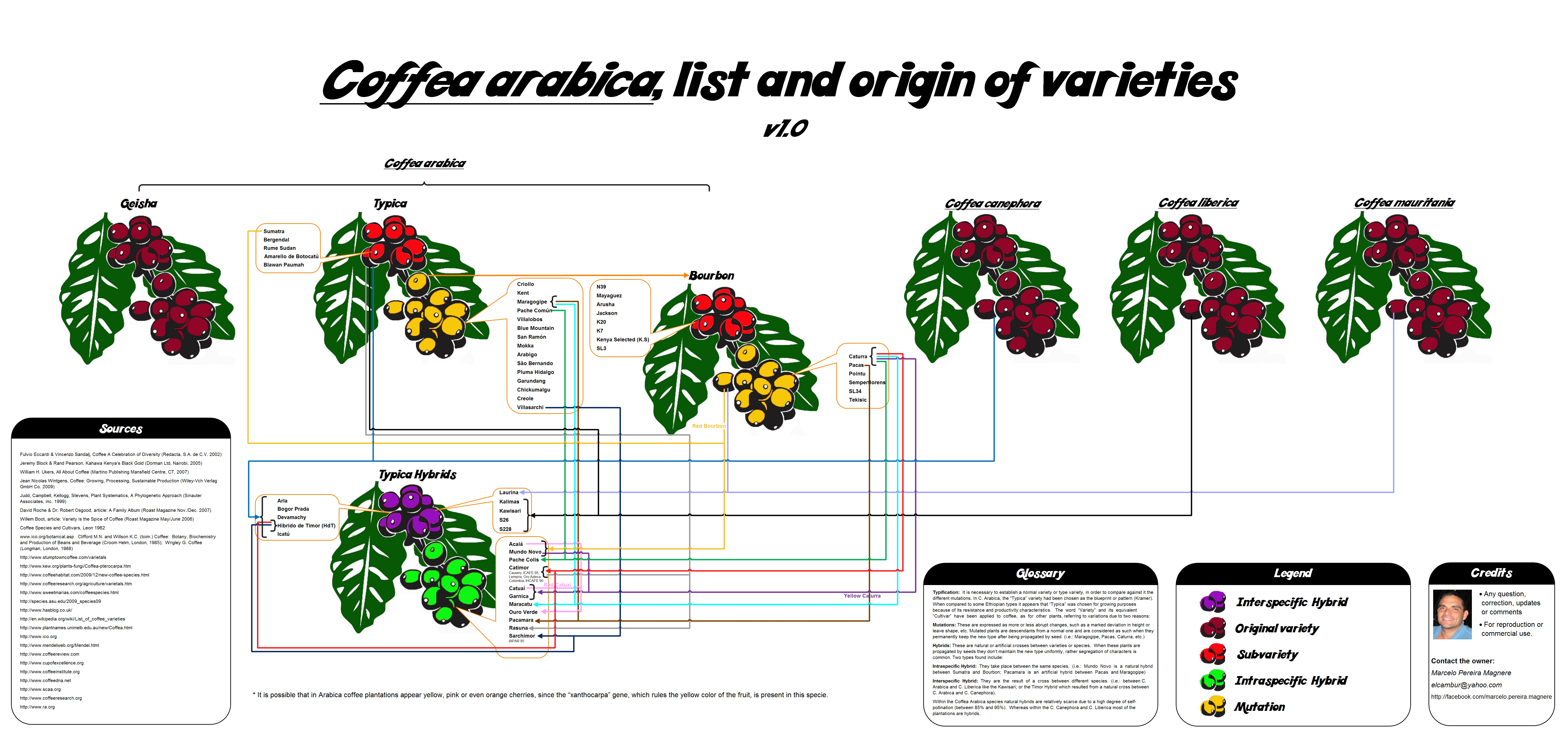
List and origin of arabica varieties TIF

Coffee varieties are the diverse subspecies derived through selective breeding or natural selection of coffee plants. While there is tremendous variability encountered in both wild and cultivated coffee plants, there are a few varieties and cultivars that are commercially important due to various unique and inherent traits such as disease resistance and fruit yield. These unique traits are what producers use to select breeds when developing crops. Therefore, at a micro level, breed selection is critical to the success of a producer and is one of the key components of cup quality.

At a macro level, the viability of the coffee industry as a whole is dependent upon breed selection. Already, the majority of coffee produced originates from producers using selected breeds. For this reason, breed selection is an important aspect of sustainability within coffee production.

== Terminology ==
There is considerable confusion as to which term to use when speaking about coffee subspecies. For the sake of clarity, within this article the terms will be used in accordance with loose guidelines put forth by the Specialty Coffee Association of America:

Variety: This rank of taxa delineates differences between plants that are smaller than in subspecies but larger than forms. A variety retains most of the characteristics of the species, but differs in some way.
Cultivar: Any variety produced by horticultural or agricultural techniques and not normally found in natural populations; a cultivated variety. Most of the varieties we know in specialty coffee are really cultivars. Bourbon and Typica are some of the most widely known cultivars.

Put simply: In this article, varieties are naturally occurring subspecies, and cultivars are cultivated subspecies. In addition, a third term, "breed" will be used as an umbrella term to simplify discussions in which the nuances between the terms 'variety' and 'cultivar' have no bearing.

== History ==
Before the end of the 19th century, arabica was indeed the exclusive producer of all coffee in the world, but the first documented outbreak of coffee leaf rust (CLR) disease decimated crops around the world, prompting many farmers to explore alternative crops.

While some countries almost completely replaced coffee production with alternative crops, Indonesia began introducing robusta, which has both a high yield in fruit and a high level of resistance to CLR. Unfortunately, robusta also produces lower quality coffee. During the first half of the 20th century, East Java pioneered systematic breeding designs on robusta coffee, which would become "exemplary to all subsequent breeding programmes of robusta coffee in India and Africa." This knowledge of robusta is critical for modern coffee breeding because robusta is the main source of pest and disease traits not found in arabica.

Prior to the mid-1900s, arabica coffee breeding involved simple line selection with an emphasis mostly on favorable adaptation to local growing conditions, fruit yield, and cup quality. But in the late 1970s and 1980s, various countries started breeding programs designed to create cultivars resistant to CLR. The intensity of these later breeding programs was a direct response to the serious threat CLR posed to crops. The results of these and other breeding programs have produced a number of important cultivars worth mentioning (see list below).

== Selection criteria ==
Farmers have designed standards for crops they would cultivate. Recent advances in breeding techniques have provided farmers with higher-yielding breeds with better disease resistance and better cup quality—all traits critical to the success of a producer. Below are some traits a producer may use to select breeds for crop development.

Cup quality refers to how well the seed or fruit itself tastes. This is considered the trait of the most importance.

Yield is the measure of the amount of fruit produced by a given breed. It is usually expressed as kilograms or tonnes per hectare per year, assuming conventional plant densities of 1,100 - 1,400 trees per hectare. High yield is one of the prime objectives of producers, and breeding specifically to achieve higher yield is a relatively new trend.

Resistance to diseases has become a dominant factor in not only natural selection but also of breeding new cultivars. Breeding for disease resistance has been mainly restricted to CLR and coffee berry disease (CBD) but also includes other diseases of locality.

Resistance to pests is not normally a trait developed by breeding, but is rather a trait selected from among breeds. Certain breeds of coffee have been found to be resistant to nematodes and leaf miner. As with diseases, robusta has been found to be the more resistant species compared to arabica.

For those who wish to grow coffee as a houseplant, and for growers who want plants that utilize the least amount of space (and therefore money) while still producing the greatest yield, small size of an individual plant is preferred.

The amount of caffeine matters to many, as caffeine has stimulating effects, but is detrimental in excessive amounts.

The maturation rate is the time that is required before a new plant will start producing fruit. An early maturation rate is desired.

== Species ==
=== C. arabica ===
According to The International Trade Centre, Arabica coffee accounted for roughly 61 per cent of the world's coffee production between 2004 and 2010. It would be higher if Arabica were not as susceptible to disease as it is. Coffee from the species C. arabica has many different varieties, each with unique characteristics.

=== C. canephora (syn. C. robusta) ===
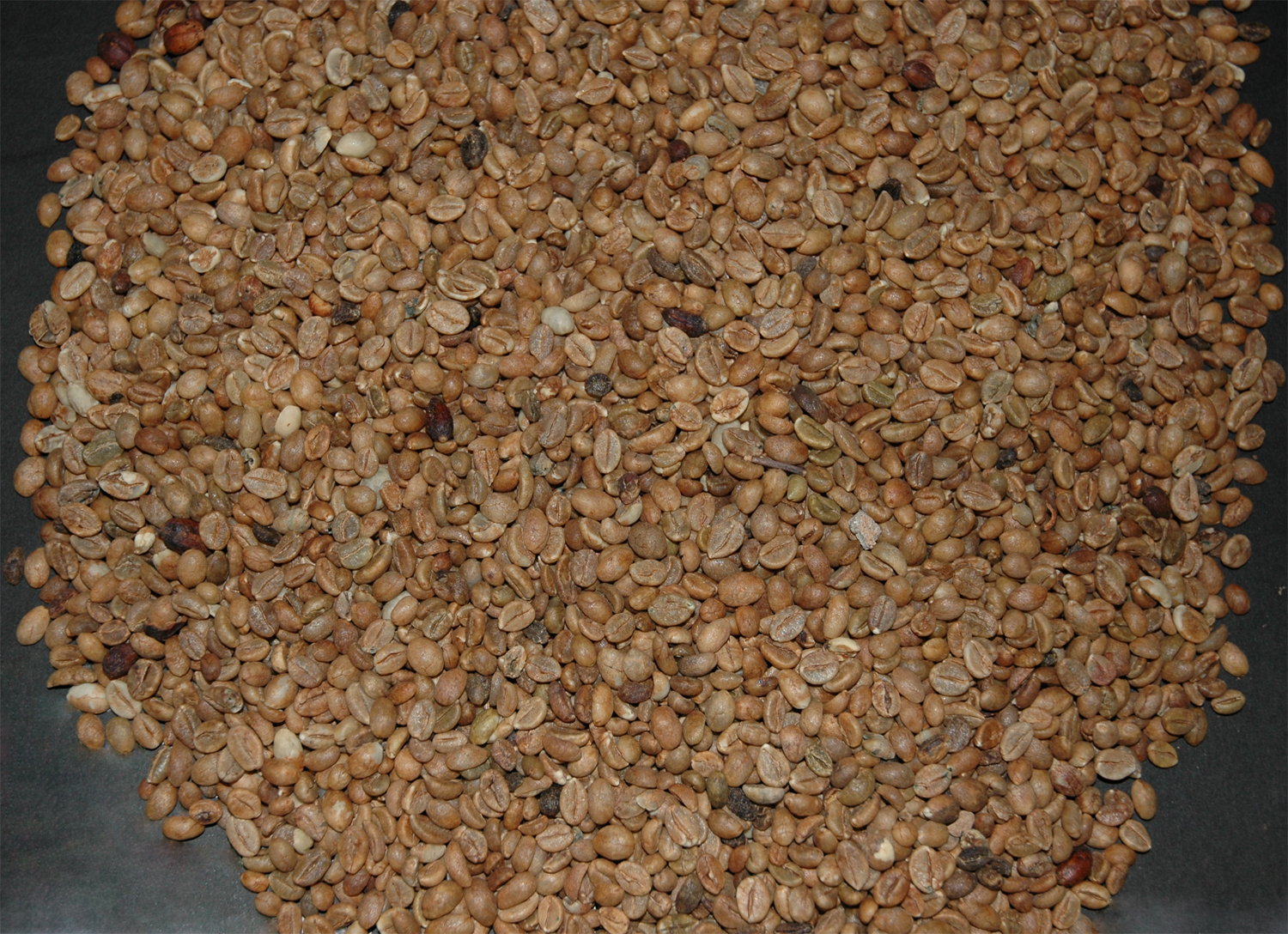
Unroasted coffee beans of the Robusta variety (Coffea canephora)

Vietnam is the world's largest Robusta producer, with Robusta accounting for 97% of Vietnam's coffee output.

While not separate varieties of bean, unusual and very expensive robustas are the Indonesian kopi luwak and the Philippine Kapéng Alamid and Kahawa Kubing. The beans are collected from the droppings of the common palm civet, whose digestive processes give it a distinctive flavor.

In the Philippines, a notable Robusta variety is Kahawa Sūg, also known as the "Sulu coffee". It has been produced in the Sulu archipelago since the 1860s.

=== Other species ===
Although not as commercially viable as Arabica or Robusta, other species of coffee exist and contain unique varieties. These include Kapeng barako or Café Baraco, (English: Barako coffee), a Liberica variety grown in the Philippines, particularly in the provinces of Batangas and Cavite. It was introduced during the period of Spanish colonization and the Philippines quickly rose to become the 4th largest producer of coffee in the early 19th century. Production was cut short, however, due to "coffee rust" infestation. Coffea charrieriana is a caffeine-free coffee found in Cameroon. Scientists from Kew Gardens rediscovered Coffea stenophylla in Sierra Leone. Previously stenophylla had not been seen in the wild since 1954, but in December 2018 Professor Jeremy Haggar, of the University of Greenwich, and Dr Aaron Davis of Kew Gardens travelled to the forests of Sierra Leone to seek it out. Stenophylla can grow at higher temperatures than Arabica and has a better flavour profile than Robusta.

=== Hybrids ===
Some varieties are hybrids of the above species.

== List of cultivars ==
Name	Species	Region(s)	Comments	Ref
Arusha	C. arabica	Mount Meru in Tanzania, and Papua New Guinea	either a Typica variety or a French Mission.	
Benguet	C. arabica	Philippines	Typica variety grown in Benguet in the Cordillera highlands of the northern Philippines since 1875.	
Bergendal, Sidikalang	C. arabica	Indonesia	Both are Typica varieties that survived the leaf rust outbreak of the 1880s; most of the other Typica in Indonesia was destroyed.	
Bernardina	C. arabica	El Salvador	A variety discovered in Finca Los Bellotos, El Salvador by Sofia and Fernando Alberto Pacas. It was first thought to be Geisha because of its aromatic profile. After studying its phenotype characteristics and DNA testing, however, it was determined to be a new, unclassified variety genetically similar to varieties found in the Agaro region of Ethiopia.	
Blue Mountain	C. arabica	Blue Mountains region of Jamaica. Also grown in Kenya, Hawaii, Haiti, Papua New Guinea (where it is known as PNG Gold) and Cameroon (where it is known as Boyo).	A unique mutation of Typica, known to have some resistance to coffee berry disease.	
Bourbon	C. arabica	Réunion, Rwanda, Latin America.	Around 1708, the French planted coffee on the island of Bourbon (now called Réunion) in the middle of the Indian Ocean, all probably from the same parent stock—the plant the Dutch gave them. Unsurprisingly, it mutated slightly and was planted throughout Brazil in the late 1800s and eventually spread through Latin America. It was not possible to achieve the same level of flavour as when in Réunion, however, due to Réunion's volcanic earth and the soil properties. Bourbon produces 20–30% more fruit than Typica strains.	
Catuai	C. arabica	Latin America	This is a hybrid of Mundo Novo and Caturra bred in Brazil in the late 1940s.	
Catimor	Interspecific hybrid	Latin America, Indonesia, India, Vietnam, China (Yunnan)	A cross between Timor coffee and Caturra coffee. It was created in Portugal in 1959. In India, this cultivar goes by the name Cauvery.	
Caturra	C. arabica	Latin and Central America	Developed from two cultivars that originated by natural mutation of Bourbon Red, originally a tall coffee shrub, found in the Serra do Caparaó. It produces a higher yield than Bourbon, due to the plant being shorter and with less distance between the branches, matures more quickly, and is more disease resistant than older, traditional arabica varieties. Its mutation is not unique; it led to the formation of the Pacas variety in El Salvador (from Bourbon) and the Villa Sarchi in Costa Rica (from Bourbon). Genetically it is very similar to Bourbon although it produces a poorer cup quality, mainly due to the variety yielding more.	
Charrier	C. charrieriana	Cameroon	This is a newly found species from Cameroon. It has gained some press recently due to its caffeine-free nature. Not yet grown commercially.	
Chiroso	C. arabica	Ethiopia	Although originally thought to be a natural mutation of Caturra, and was first discovered in Colombia, genetic testing has revealed that Chiroso has delineated from Ethiopian Landraces. The name "Chiroso" is a nickname from the Colombian biscuit "Achira", referencing the bean's unique shape and size.	
Harar	C. arabica	Ethiopia	From the region of Harar, Ethiopia. Known for its complex, fruity flavor that resembles a dry red wine. All three Ethiopian varieties are trademarked names with the rights owned by Ethiopia.	
Sidamo	C. arabica	Ethiopia	From the Sidamo (now Oromia) region of Ethiopia as well. All three Ethiopian varieties are trademarked names with the rights owned by Ethiopia.	
Yirgacheffe	C. arabica	Ethiopia	From the Yirgachefe district in the Gedeo Zone of the Southern Nations, Nationalities, and People's Region of Ethiopia. All three Ethiopian varieties are trademarked names with the rights owned by Ethiopia.	
French Mission	C. arabica	Africa	French Mission is actually Bourbon that was planted in East Africa by French Missionaries around 1897.	
Geisha	C. arabica	Ethiopia, Tanzania, Costa Rica, Panama, Colombia, Peru	Geisha or Gesha variety, grown in the highlands of Boquete in Chiriquí Province, Panama, highly sought after at auction, achieving high prices. Originally from the village of Gesha, Ethiopia. It was planted in the 1950s as a rust-resistant crop and rediscovered in the early 2000s. The most expensive varietal at coffee auctions, fetching US$350.25 in 2013. Breaking its own record as the most expensive coffee in the world at US$803.00 /lb of Natural (processed) Geisha in the "Best of Panama" auctions in 2018.	
Bonifieur	C. arabica	Guadeloupe	It was used to help improve the quality of other types of coffees and some experts consider it to be one of the best types of coffee in the world.	
Kona	C. arabica	Hawaii	Grown on the slopes of Hualalai and Mauna Loa in the Kona District on the Big Island of Hawaii. Coffee was first introduced to the Islands by Chief Boki, the Governor of Oahu, in 1825.	
Java	Interspecific hybrid	Indonesia	From the island of Java, in Indonesia. This coffee was once so widely traded that "java" became a slang term for coffee. Java encompasses a regional style, not a cultivar of coffee.	
K7	C. arabica	Africa	A Kenyan selection of French Mission Bourbon selected at Legelet Estate in Muhoroni, Kenya. Selected based on cupping trials.	
Maragogipe	C. arabica	Latin America	Maragogipe ('y') is considered to be a natural mutation from Typica. It was first discovered near Maragogipe, in Brazil's state Bahia. Maragogype is well known for producing big beans.	
Maracaturra	C. arabica	Latin America	Maracaturra is a man-made hybrid plant between Caturra and Maragogype.|It was first bred in order to capture the flavor profile of Maragogype with the higher yield and efficiency of the Caturra Varietal.	
Mayagüez	C. arabica	Africa	A Bourbon cultivar grown in Rwanda.	
Mocha	C. arabica	Yemen	Yemeni coffee traded through the once major port of Mocha. Not to be confused with the preparation style (coffee with cocoa).	
Mundo Novo	C. arabica	Latin America	Mundo Novo is a hybrid between Bourbon and Typica, crossed in the 1940s.	
Orange, Yellow Bourbon	C. arabica	Latin America, Vietnam	Red Bourbon and Orange Bourbon are types of Bourbon that have been selected from spontaneous mutation.	
Pacamara	C. arabica	Latin America	Pacamara is a hybrid between the Bourbon mutation Pacas and Maragogype. It was bred in El Salvador in 1958 probably to achieve a Typica variety that produces larger beans.	
Pacas	C. arabica	Latin America	A natural mutation of the Bourbon variety found in El Salvador in 1949.	
Pache Colis	C. arabica	Latin America	Pache Colis is a hybrid between Pache Comum and Caturra. This variety produces distinctly larger fruit and roughly textured foliage.	
Pache Comum	C. arabica	Latin America	Is a mutation of Typica first found in Santa Rosa, Guatemala.	
Ruiru 11	C. arabica	Kenya	Ruiru 11 was released in 1985 by the Kenyan Coffee Research Station. While the variety is generally disease resistant, it produces a lower cup quality than K7, SL28 and 34.	
S795	C. arabica	India, Indonesia	Probably the most commonly planted Arabica in India and Southeast Asia, known for its balanced cup and subtle flavour notes of mocca. Released during the 1940s, it is a cross between the Kents and S.288 varieties.	
Sagada	C. arabica	Philippines	Typica variety grown in Sagada and Besao, Mountain Province in the Cordillera highlands of the northern Philippines since the 1890s and early 1900s.	
Santos	C. arabica	Brazil	Brazil Santos is usually used as a grading term for Brazilian coffee rather than a variety of Arabica. The name refers to the port in Brazil where coffee passed through, and was regarded as higher quality than "Brazilian coffee". Brazilian Santos is usually of the Bourbon variety.	
Sarchimor	Interspecific hybrid	Costa Rica, India	A hybrid between the Costa Rican Villa Sarchi and the Timor variety. Because of its Timor parent, Sarchimor is quite resistant to leaf rust disease and stem borer. As well as Costa Rica, it is grown in India.	
Selection 9 (Sln 9)	C. arabica	India	A hybrid between the Ethiopian Tafarikela and the Timor variety.	
SL28	C. arabica	Kenya	A selection, by Scott Labs in Kenya from the Tanganyika Drought Resistant variety from northern Tanzania in 1931.	
SL34	C. arabica	Kenya	Selected by Scott Labs from the French Mission variety grown in Kenya. Selected for its superior cup quality (although inferior to SL28), but not resistant to CBD, CLR or BBC.	
Sulawesi Toraja Kalossi	C. arabica	Indonesia	Actually the S795 varietal, grown at high altitudes on the island of Sulawesi (formerly Celebes), Indonesia. Kalossi is the small town in central Sulawesi that serves as the collection point for the coffee and Toraja is the mountainous area in which the coffee is grown. Sulawesi exhibits a rich, full body, well-balanced acidity and is multi-dimensional in character. Sulawesi itself is not a cultivar of coffee.	
Sumatra Mandheling and Sumatra Lintong	C. arabica	Indonesia	Mandheling is named after the Mandailing people located in North Sumatra, Indonesia. The name is the result of a misunderstanding by the first foreign purchaser of the variety, and no coffee is actually produced in the "Mandailing region". Lintong on the other hand, is named after the Lintong district, also located in North Sumatra. This is not a specific cultivar, but rather a region with a specific processing style.	
Timor, Arabusta	Interspecific hybrid	Indonesia	Timor is not actually a variety of coffea arabica, but a hybrid of two species of coffee; coffea arabica and coffea canephora (also called Robusta). It was found on the island of Timor around the 1940s and it was cultivated because of its resistance to leaf rust (which most arabica coffee is susceptible to). It is called Hybrido de Timor in the Americas and Tim Tim or Bor Bor in Indonesia. Another hybrid between the two species is called Arabusta but generally only found in Africa.	
Typica	C. arabica	Worldwide	Typica originated from Yemeni stock, taken first to Malabar, India, and later to Indonesia by the Dutch, and the Philippines by the Spanish. It later made its way to the West Indies to the French colony at Martinique. Typica has genetically evolved to produce new characteristics, often considered new varietals: Criollo (South America), Arabigo (Americas), Kona (Hawaii), Pluma Hidalgo (Mexico), Garundang (Sumatra), Blue Mountain (Jamaica, Papua New Guinea), San Bernardo & San Ramon (Brazil), Kents & Chikmagalore(India)	
Bugishu	Interspecific hybrid	Uganda	Although it mostly produces Robusta coffee, there is a quality Arabica bean grown there known as Bugishu around the Sipi Falls area.	
Brutte	C. arabica		Variety of coffee (arabica) Bred in 2014 in the south of India in g.Madras, 1996 Chennai Tamil Nadu. Grown at an altitude of 1500 m above sea level, which in itself is a good indicator. Differ by more quantitative tannin to 14–15% and trigonelline 1.5–1.7%.	
Starmaya	C. arabica	Nicaragua	First F1 hybrid coffee tree able to be propagated by seed. Is resistant to rust and has a very good cup quality potential at high altitudes.	

== See also ==
- Low caffeine coffee
