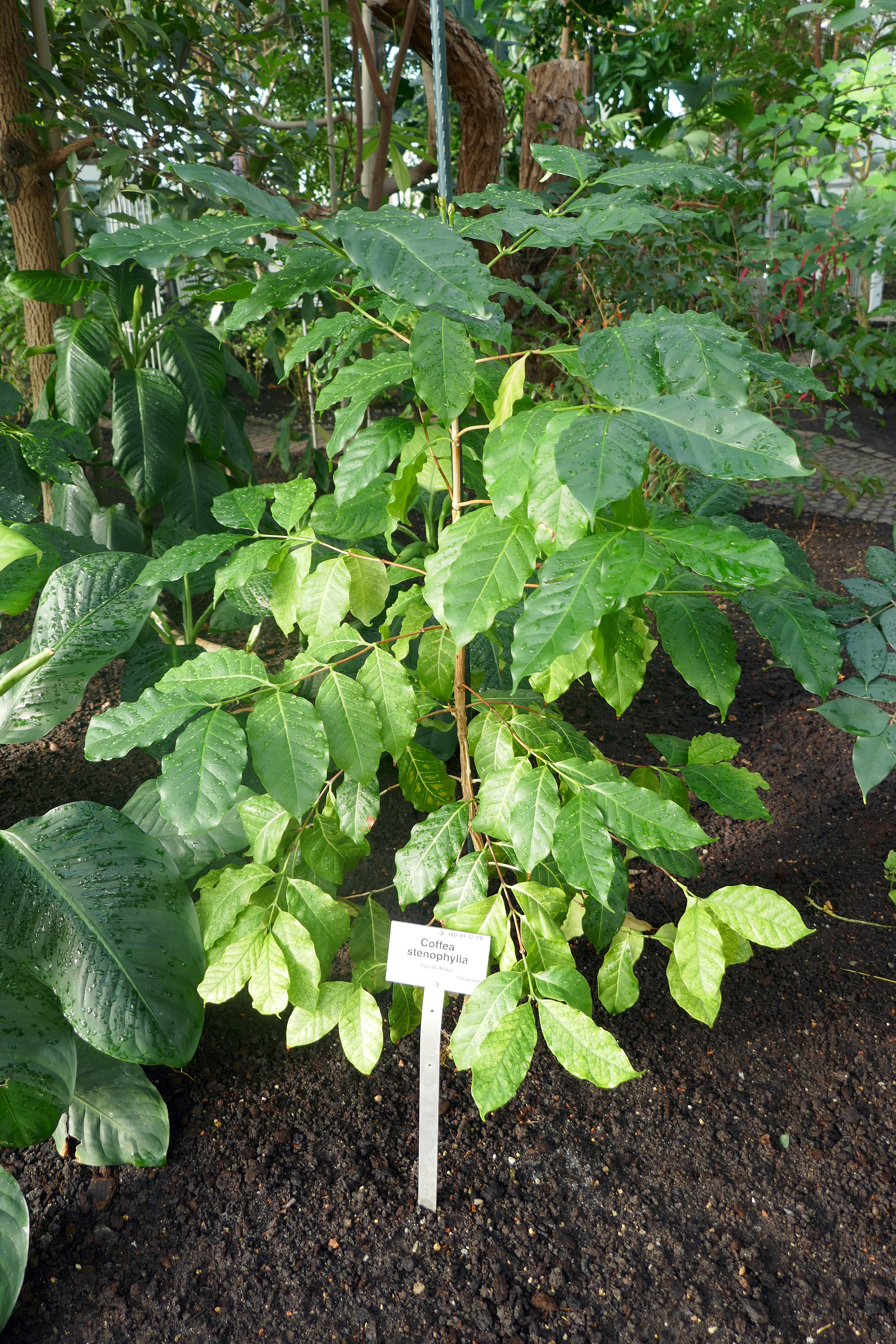

Conservation status
- Vulnerable (IUCN 3.1)

Scientific classification
- Kingdom: Plantae
- Clade: Embryophytes
- Clade: Tracheophytes
- Clade: Spermatophytes
- Clade: Angiosperms
- Clade: Eudicots
- Clade: Asterids
- Order: Gentianales
- Family: Rubiaceae
- Genus: Coffea
- Species: C. stenophylla

Binomial name
- Coffea stenophylla G.Don
- It is native to western tropical Africa

= Coffea stenophylla =

Species of plant

Coffea stenophylla, also known as highland coffee or Sierra Leone coffee, is a species of Coffea originating in West Africa.

As of 2020, it was not commercially cultivated, because its low yield and small berries make it inferior to the two economically dominant species, Coffea arabica and Coffea canephora (robusta).

Research is being done to evaluate the sensory and agronomic benefits of commercially cultivating it as a method of expanding the genetic diversification of global coffee stock and increasing resilience to both climate change and crop disease pressures.

== Description ==
=== Vegetative characteristics ===
Coffea stenophylla is a heat-tolerant, 3–6 m tall shrub or small tree with glabrous, flattened to subterete branches bearing opposite, glossy, oblong-lanceolate, petiolate, stipulate, 4–10 cm long, and 1.5–2.5 cm wide leaves with a pointed apex.

=== Generative characteristics ===
The subsessile to pedunculate, 2–4-flowered inflorescences with up to 2.5 mm long peduncles bear white flowers. Ripe C. stenophylla berries are a dark purple, in contrast to C. arabica, whose berries turn red when ripe.

It has a flavor profile comparable to C. arabica and has been described as complex and naturally sweet with medium-high acidity, fruitiness, and a good mouth feel.

== Taxonomy ==
It was described by George Don in 1834.

=== Etymology ===
The specific epithet is derived from the Greek: stenos (narrow) and phyllon (leaf) to give "narrow-leaved".

== Distribution and habitat ==
C. stenophylla is native to the West African countries of Guinea, Ivory Coast, Liberia and Sierra Leone.

== Conservation ==
Despite being cultivated on a small scale throughout much of West Africa, it is still considered Vulnerable by the IUCN Red List due to heavy deforestation and habitat fragmentation over the last few decades in its native range in the Upper Guinean forests, which may affect wild populations.

== History ==
C. stenophylla was discovered by Swedish botanist Adam Afzelius in the 18th century, and first published by Scottish botanist George Don.

A sample of seeds was obtained by Sir William H. Quayle Jones, the Deputy Governor of Sierra Leone, in 1894. The plant was cultivated by the Royal Botanical Gardens in Kew, and samples were sent to Trinidad.

J. H. Hart, F.L.S, the Superintendent of the Royal Botanic Gardens, Trinidad, reported in 1898 that the plants had fruited for the first time, four years from being planted. He described the flavour of the prepared cup of coffee as excellent, and equal to the finest Coffea arabica.

C. stenophylla produces small berries and has a low yield compared to the commercially dominant species and is therefore not widely used in global coffee production. Field research done in 2018 indicates that C. stenophylla was not currently being commercially cultivated, and a search was performed to try to find living specimens. Samples were finally located in 2019 and 2020 growing in the wild. This wild plant stock is currently being propagated for future sensory and agronomic evaluation as well as species protection.

== Future uses ==
According to Aaron Davis, head of coffee research at Britain's Royal Botanic Gardens, Kew, the cultivation of C. stenophylla could be used to further diversify the genetic portfolio of cultivated coffee around the world. Further diversification is considered necessary to increase resilience to climate change as well as pressures from global crop diseases, such as rust.

C. stenophylla has been found to have good agronomic performance at low elevations (c. 150 m). This could expand the potential area used for coffee cultivation, which is typically higher elevations of 800 m and above.

It has been found to be a heat-tolerant species and some scientists believe it could help reduce the impact of climate change on coffee farmers.
