= Cup of Excellence =

- Description: Premier coffee competition and auction for high-quality coffee
- Presented by: Alliance for Coffee Excellence (ACE)
- Website: cupofexcellence.org

The Cup of Excellence is an annual competition held in several countries to identify the highest quality coffees produced. It is organized by the Alliance for Coffee Excellence, which was founded by George Howell, Susie Spindler and Silvio Leite. The Cup of Excellence has worked to fundamentally change the high quality coffee industry and has supported advances in farming and premiums to farmers that would have been impossible without it.

== Format ==
The winning coffees are sold in internet auctions. The concept was developed by the Gourmet Coffee Project of the International Coffee Organization (ICO). This project was devised by Pablo Dubois, Head of Operations of the ICO and Frans Bolvenkel, of the International Trade Centre (ITC) at a meeting in Geneva in late 1994. This project, supervised by the ICO, managed by the ITC and largely financed by the Common Fund for Commodities, ran from 1995 to 2000, and aimed to develop methodologies for the creation of new "gourmet" or high-quality speciality coffees. The Cup of Excellence competition has been dubbed as the 'Oscars of the coffee world'.

Coffee is scored and priced on the market based on two quality attributes that are measured, material and symbolic attributes. These can be defined as aromas, flavors, certification, market size, high altitude plot, and country of origin.

== History ==
The competitions began in 1999. As of 2020, competitions are held in Bolivia, Brazil, Ecuador, Colombia, Peru, El Salvador, Costa Rica, Nicaragua, Guatemala, Honduras, Mexico, Burundi, Ethiopia, Indonesia, and Rwanda. In the course of the competition each coffee is tested at least five times. Only those coffees with high scores continuously move forward in the competition. The final winners are awarded the Cup of Excellence and sold via an internet auction to the highest bidder. The purpose of the auctions are for farmers to receive increased premiums for their exemplary coffees and to set transparency in pricing. The market for coffee has increased over 330% from 2003 to 2011.

In 2025, Cup of Excellence announced they would be switching from the online auction provider M-Cultivo to V-Auction.

== Organization ==
The COE board of directions

Noelia Villalobos - Board Chair

Tim Taylor - Treasurer

Paul Stewart - Secretary

Cory Bush - CEO of Beyers Koffie, Board Member

Thomas Pulpan - Kaffebrenneriet, Board Member

Carl Cervone- Enveritas, Board Member

Aleco Chigounis- Red Fox, Board Member

John Moore- CEO of Vassilaros & Sons Coffee, Board Member

Vanusia Nogueria- Executive Director ICO, Board Member
