= Coffee bean =

Seed of the coffee plant

Coffee beans
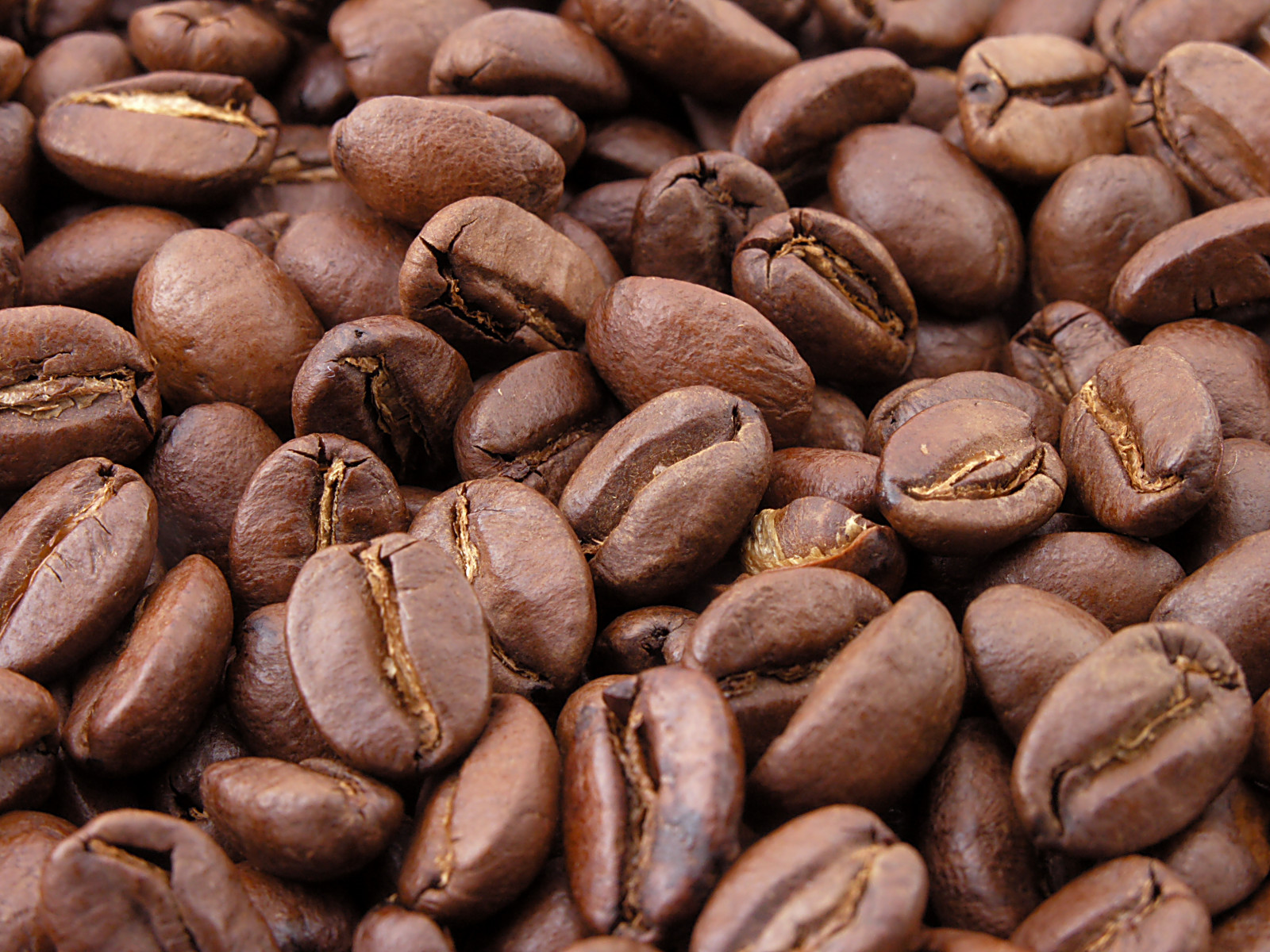
- Roasted coffee beans
- Origin: Horn of Africa

A coffee bean is a seed from the Coffea plant and the source for coffee. This fruit is often referred to as a coffee cherry, but unlike the cherry, which usually contains a single pit, it most commonly contains two seeds with their flat sides together. The seeds are referred to as beans because of their appearance, though they are not true beans. A few coffee cherries, referred to as "peaberries" contain a single seed; they make up around 10% to 15% of all coffee beans. It is often claimed that peaberries are superior to normal beans, but there is little hard evidence to support this. Like Brazil nuts (a seed) and white rice, coffee beans consist mostly of endosperm.

The two most economically important varieties of coffee plants are the arabica and the robusta, accounting for approximately 60% and 40% of the coffee produced worldwide, respectively. Arabica beans contain 0.8–1.4% caffeine and robusta beans contain 1.7–4.0% caffeine. As coffee is one of the world's most widely consumed beverages, coffee beans are a major cash crop and an important export product, accounting for over 50% of some developing nations' foreign exchange earnings. In 2023 the largest producer of coffee and coffee beans was Brazil. Other main exporters of coffee beans are Colombia, Vietnam, and Ethiopia.

== History ==
=== Significant dates ===
- According to legend, the coffee plant was discovered in Ethiopia by a goat herder named Kaldi around 850 AD, who observed increased physical activity in his goats after they consumed coffee beans.
- First cultivation in India (Chikmagalur) – 1600
- First cultivation in Europe – 1616
- First cultivation in Java – 1699
- First cultivation in Caribbean (Cuba, Hispaniola, Jamaica, Puerto Rico) – 1715–1730
- First cultivation in Dutch East Indies – 1720
- First cultivation in South America – 1730
- Roasted beans first sold on retail market (Pittsburgh) – 1865
- Various coffee extracts, and powdered instant coffee, developed in the late 19th century

=== Distribution ===
The bean belt in yellow: The 20 largest producers (2011) are in green.

Brazil produces about 45% of the world's total coffee exports.

Coffee plants grow within a defined area between the tropics of Cancer and Capricorn, termed the bean belt or coffee belt.

Coffee bean production

Coffee yields

== Etymology ==
The Oxford English Dictionary suggests that the European languages generally appear to have adopted the name from Turkish kahveh, about 1600, perhaps through Italian caffè. Arab qahwah, in Turkish pronounced kahveh, the name of the infusion or beverage; said by Arab lexicographers to have originally meant "wine" or some type of wine, and to be a derivative of a verb-root qahiya "to have no appetite". Another common theory is that the name derives from Kaffa Province, Ethiopia, where the species may have originated.

== Coffee plant ==
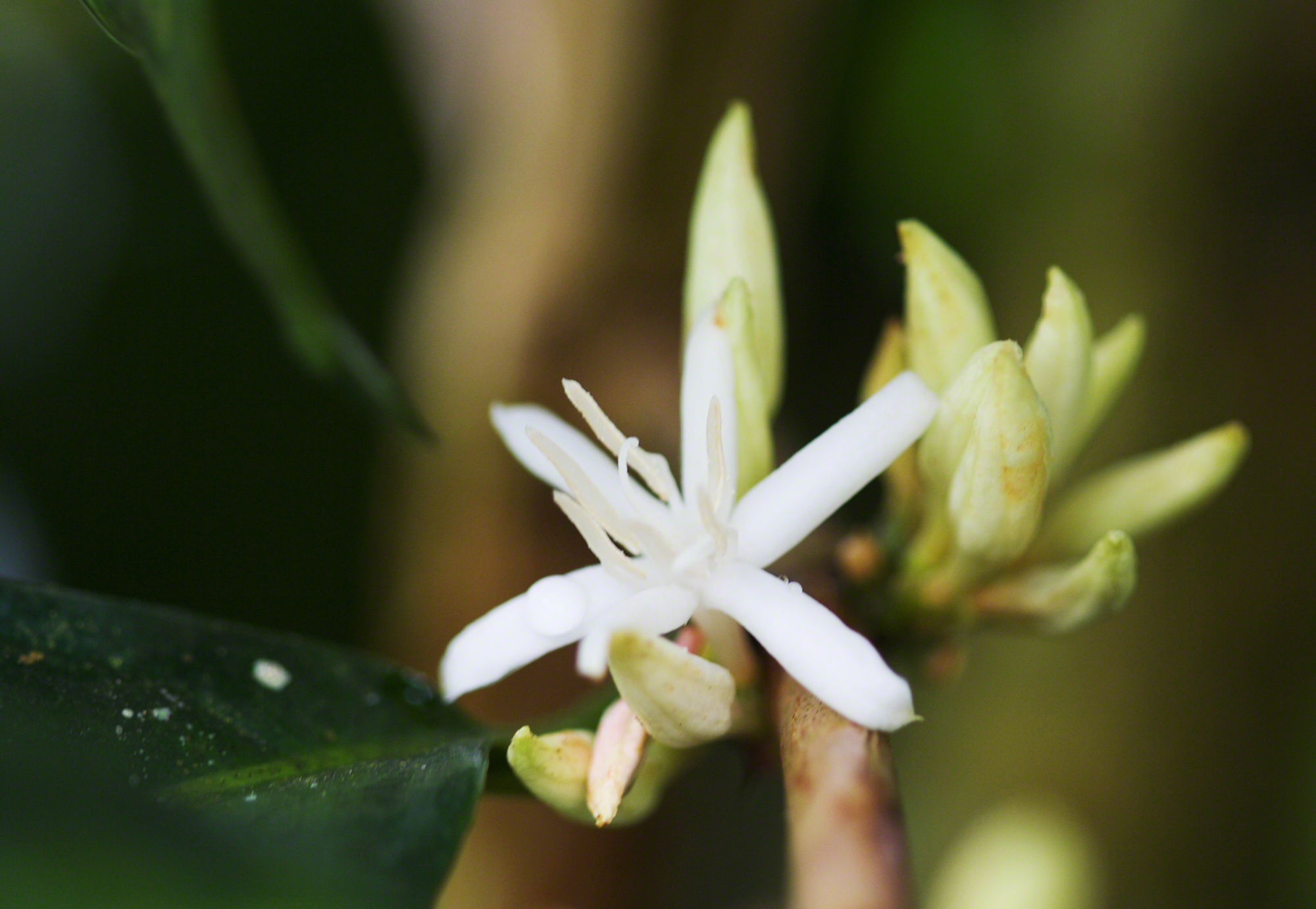
The flower of a Singararutang coffee tree

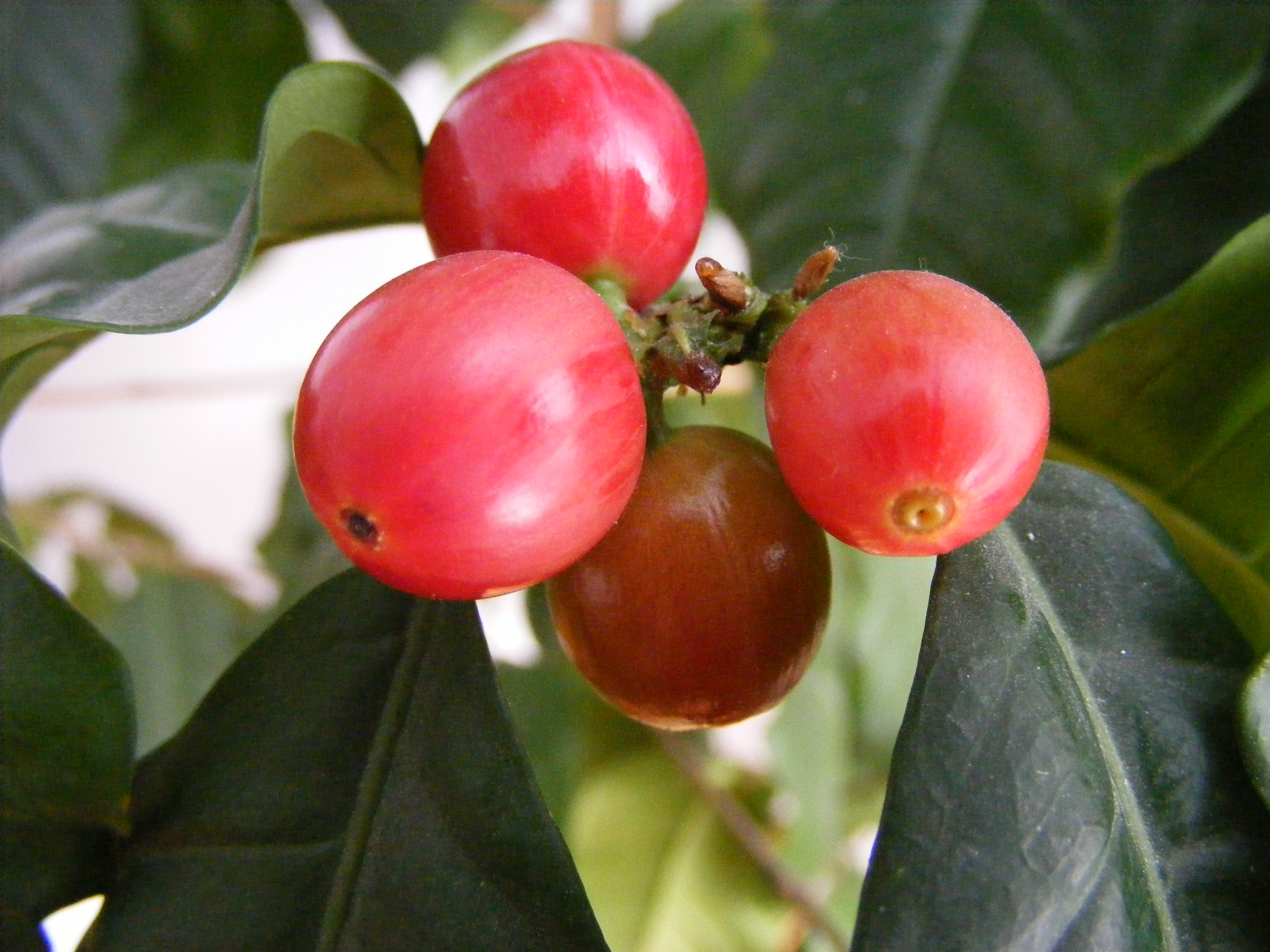
Coffee berries

The coffee tree produces fruit often referred to as a coffee cherry, but unlike the cherry, which contains a single pit, it most commonly contains two seeds with their flat sides together. The seeds are referred to as beans because of their appearance, though they are not true beans. A few coffee cherries, referred to as "peaberries" contain a single seed; they make up around 10% to 15% of all coffee beans. It is sometimes asserted that because the single bean does not need to share nutrients between two separated beans, it has a superior flavour profile with bright acidity, sweetness, and concentrated and complex flavours, but there is little evidence to support this; for example, peaberries may have been selected from high-quality beans.

Coffee trees range from 5 to 10 m (16 to 33 ft) in height. As the tree gets older, it produces less fruit and slowly loses its resistance to pests and diseases. The coffee beans are in the seeds of fruits from trees and shrubs that originally grew naturally in African forests. Humans produce coffee by roasting, grinding and brewing the raw (green) coffee beans.

Coffee plants are often grown in rows spaced apart depending on the desired density chosen by the farmer. Some farmers plant shade trees or cash-crop trees, such as orange trees, around them, or plant the coffee on the sides of hills to provide the conditions coffee needs to flourish. Ideally, Arabica coffee beans are grown at temperatures between 15 and 24 °C (59 and 75 °F) and Robusta between 24 and 30 °C (75 and 86 °F), and receive between 500 and 3,000 mm (20 and 118 in) of rainfall per year. More rain is needed at the beginning of the season when the fruit is developing, and less later in the season as it ripens.

Two lesser-known species grown for consumption are Coffea liberica and Coffea racemosa.

=== Processing ===
When the fruit is ripe, it is almost always hand-picked, using either "selective picking", where only the ripe fruit is removed, or "strip-picking", where all of the fruit is removed from a limb all at once. Selective picking yields higher-quality coffee because the cherries are picked at their ripest. Indiscriminate strip-picking harvests unripe, ripe, and over-ripe fruit, requiring sorting after picking.

Two methods are primarily used to process coffee berries. The first, "wet" or "washed" process, has historically usually been carried out in Central America and areas of Africa. The flesh of the cherries is separated from the seeds and then the seeds are fermented by soaking in water for about two days. This softens the mucilage, a sticky pulp residue attached to the seeds; it is then washed off with water.

The "dry processing" method, cheaper and simpler, was historically used for lower-quality beans in Brazil and much of Africa, but now brings a premium when done well. Twigs and other foreign objects are separated from the berries, and the fruit is then spread out in the sun on concrete, bricks or raised beds for two to three weeks, turned regularly for even drying.

In Asia, a third type of processing is occasionally used: the Asian palm civet eats coffee berries and excretes the beans. The civet chooses to harvest the ripest cherries; its digestive system then processes the beans by breaking down the mucilage and pulp surrounding the seed. Once the seeds are excreted by the civet, they can be harvested, processed and sold as a niche product. These beans are called kopi luwak, and are sold as a rare coffee at a high price.

== Composition ==
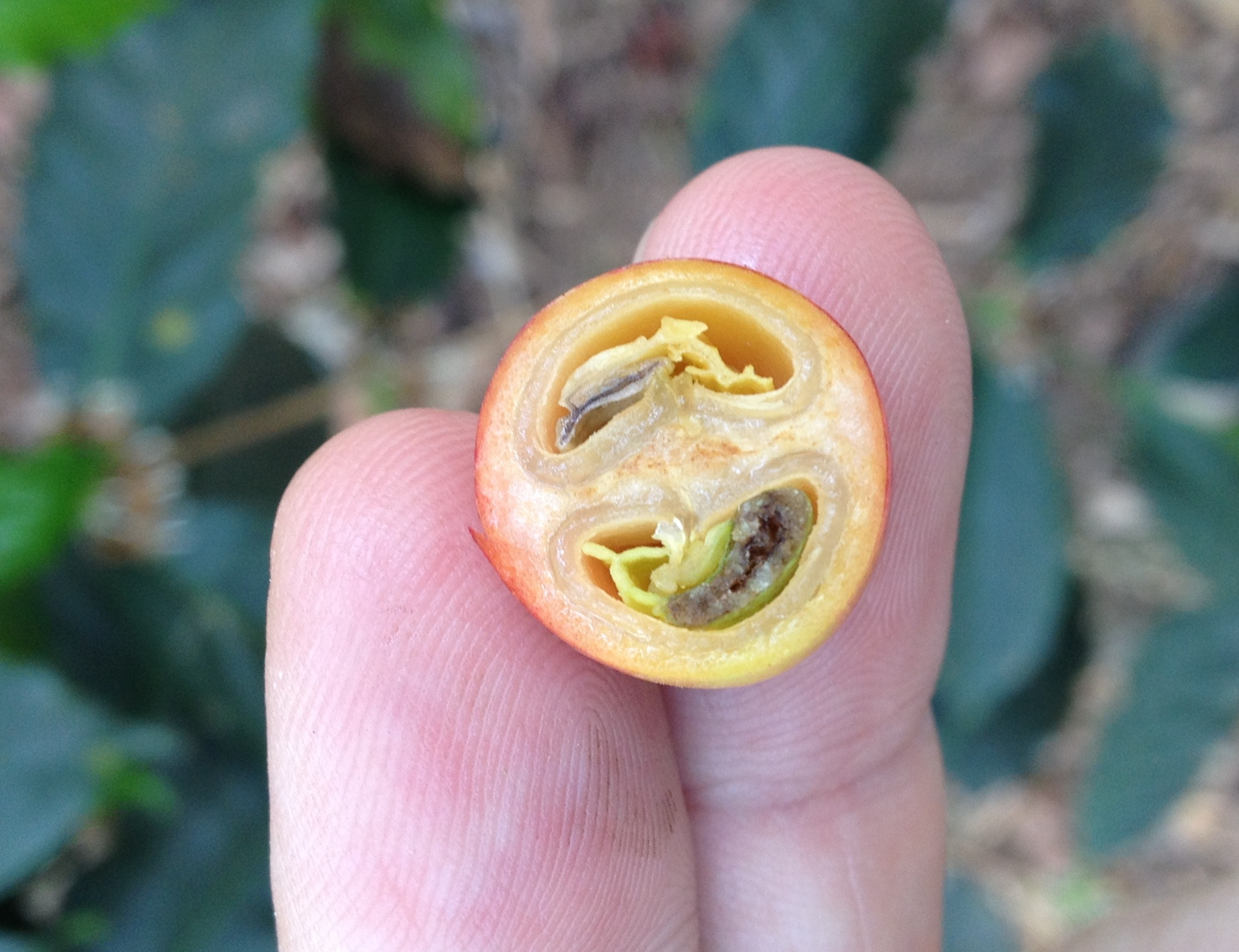
Coffee cherry cross-section

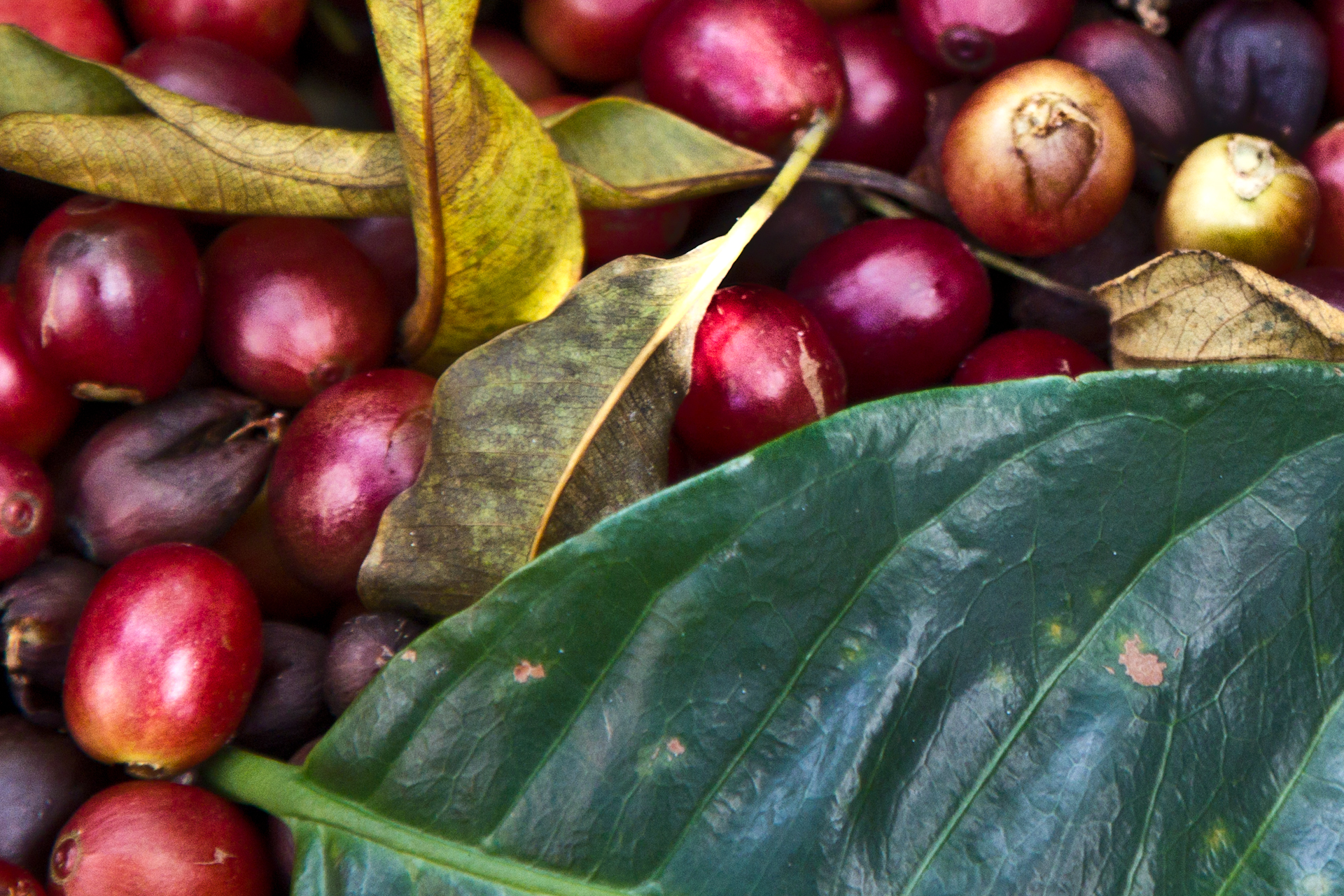
Freshly harvested coffee cherries

Non-volatile and volatile compounds in coffee beans, such as caffeine, deter many insects and animals from eating them. After harvesting, coffee beans are processed by wet or dry methods to remove the outer pulp and mucilage, and have an intact wax layer on the outer surface. When immature, they are green. When mature, they have a brown to yellow or reddish color. A typical dried coffee bean weighs 300 to 330 mg (about 0.01 oz). Unroasted mature or immature coffee beans are referred to as green, or raw.

The non-volatile and volatile compounds in the coffee bean contribute to its flavor when roasted. Non-volatile nitrogenous compounds (including alkaloids, trigonelline, proteins, and free amino acids) and carbohydrates are of major importance in producing the full aroma of roasted coffee and for its biological action.

Since the mid-2000s, green coffee extract has been sold as a nutritional supplement and has been clinically studied for its chlorogenic acid content and for its lipolytic and weight-loss properties. A 2024 publication found that the concentration of trace elements, alkaloids, and CGAs in coffee beans decreases with increase in growing altitude, while the content of fatty acids increases; the content of organic acids shows no obvious change trends.

=== Non-volatile alkaloids ===
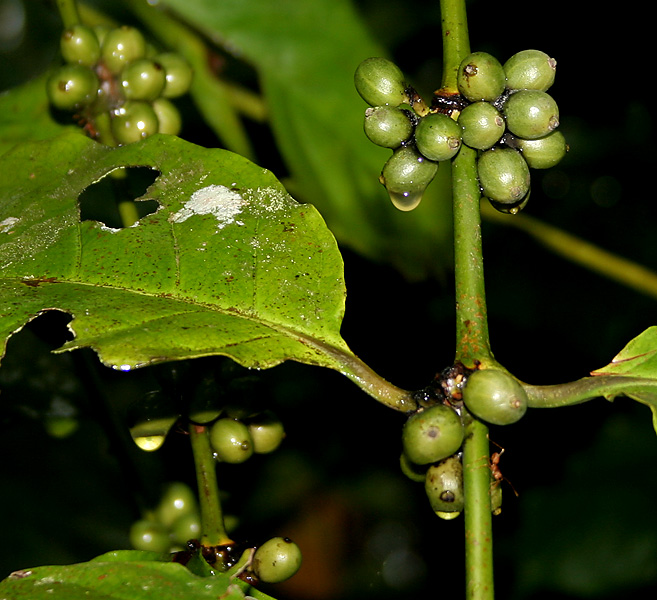
Immature Coffea canephora berries on a tree in Goa, India

Caffeine (1,3,7-trimethylxanthine) is the alkaloid most present in green and roasted coffee beans. The content of caffeine is between 1.0% and 2.5% by weight of dry green coffee beans. The content of caffeine does not change during maturation of green coffee beans, but higher caffeine content is found in plants grown at higher altitudes. The solubility of caffeine in water increases with temperature and with the addition of chlorogenic acids, citric acid, or tartaric acid, all of which are present in green coffee beans. For example, 1 g (0.035 oz) of caffeine dissolves in 46 mL (1.6 US fl oz) of water at room temperature, and 5.5 mL (0.19 US fl oz) at 80 °C (176 °F).

Trigonelline (N-methyl-nicotinate) is a derivative of vitamin B_{3} that is not as bitter as caffeine. In green coffee beans, the content is between 0.6% and 1.0%. At a roasting temperature of 230 °C (446 °F), 85% of the trigonelline is degraded to nicotinic acid, leaving small amounts of the unchanged molecule in the roasted beans.

=== Proteins and amino acids ===
Proteins account for 8% to 12% of dried green coffee beans. A majority of the proteins are of the 11-S storage kind (alpha – component of 32 kDa, beta – component of 22 kDa), most of which are degraded to free amino acids during maturation of green coffee beans. Further, 11-S storage proteins are degraded to their individual amino acids under roasting temperature, thus are an additional source of bitter components due to generation of Maillard reaction products. High temperature and oxygen concentration and low pH degrade 11-S storage proteins of green coffee beans to low-molecular-weight peptides and amino acids.

Mature coffee contains free amino acids (4.0 mg amino acid/g robusta coffee and up to 4.5 mg amino acid/g arabica coffee). In Coffea arabica, alanine is the amino acid with the highest concentration, i.e., 1.2 mg/g, followed by asparagine of 0.66 mg/g, whereas in C. robusta, alanine is present at a concentration of 0.8 mg/g and asparagine at 0.36 mg/g.

Roasted coffee beans do not contain any free amino acids; the amino acids in green coffee beans are degraded under roasting temperature to Maillard products (reaction products between the aldehyde group of sugar and the alpha-amino group of the amino acids). Further, diketopiperazines, e.g. cyclo(proline-proline), cyclo(proline-leucine), and cyclo(proline-isoleucine), are generated from the corresponding amino acids, and are the major source of the bitter taste of roasted coffee. The bitter flavor of diketopiperazines is perceptible at around 20 mg/liter of water. The content of diketopiperazines in espresso is about 20 to 30 mg, which is responsible for its bitterness.

=== Carbohydrates ===
Carbohydrates make up about 50% of the dry weight of green coffee beans. The carbohydrate fraction of green coffee is dominated by polysaccharides, such as arabinogalactan, galactomannan, and cellulose, contributing to the tasteless flavor of green coffee. Mature brown to yellow coffee beans contain fewer residues of galactose and arabinose at the side chain of the polysaccharides, making the green coffee bean more resistant to physical breakdown and less soluble in water.

=== Lipids ===
The lipids found in green coffee include: linoleic acid, palmitic acid, oleic acid, stearic acid, arachidic acid, diterpenes, triglycerides, unsaturated long-chain fatty acids, esters, and amides. The total content of lipids in dried green coffee is 11.7–14 g/100 g. Lipids are present on the surface and in the interior matrix of green coffee beans. On the surface, they include derivatives of carboxylic acid-5-hydroxytryptamides with an amide bond to fatty acids (unsaturated C6 to C24) making up to 3% of total lipid content or 1200 to 1400 microgram/g dried green coffee bean. Such compounds form a wax-like cover on the surface of the coffee bean (200–300 mg lipids/100 g dried green coffee bean) protecting the interior matrix against oxidation and insects. Further, such molecules have antioxidative activity due to their chemical structure.

Lipids of the interior tissue are triglycerides, linoleic acid (46% of total free lipids), palmitic acid (30% to 35% of total free lipids), and esters. Arabica beans have a higher content of lipids (13.5–17.4 g lipids/100 g dried green coffee beans) than robustas (9.8–10.7 g lipids/100 g dried green coffee beans). The content of diterpenes is about 20% of the lipid fraction. The diterpenes found in green coffee include cafestol, kahweol and 16-O-methylcafestol. Some of these diterpenes have been shown in in vitro experiments to protect liver tissue against chemical oxidation. In coffee oil from green coffee beans the diterpenes are esterified with saturated long chain fatty acids.

=== Non-volatile chlorogenic acids ===
Chlorogenic acids belong to a group of compounds known as phenolic acids. The content of chlorogenic acids in dried arabica green coffee beans is 65 mg/g, and in robusta 140 mg/g, depending on the time of harvest. At roasting temperature, more than 70% of chlorogenic acids are destroyed.

Chlorogenic acids are homologous compounds comprising caffeic acid, ferulic acid and 3,4-dimethoxycinnamic acid, which are connected by an ester bond to the hydroxyl groups of quinic acid. Chlorogenic acids have a bitter taste in low concentrations such as 50 mg/L water. At higher concentrations of 1 g/L water, they have a sour taste. Chlorogenic acids increase the solubility of caffeine, and are important modulators of taste.

=== Volatile compounds ===
Volatile compounds of green coffee beans include short-chain fatty acids, aldehydes, and nitrogen-containing aromatic molecules, such as derivatives of pyrazines (green-herbaceous-earthy odor). When green coffee beans are roasted, other molecules with the typical pleasant aroma of coffee are generated, which are not present in fresh green coffee. During roasting, the major part of the unpleasant-tasting volatile compounds are neutralized.
