= Word of Wisdom (Latter Day Saints) =

Health code of the Latter Day Saint movement

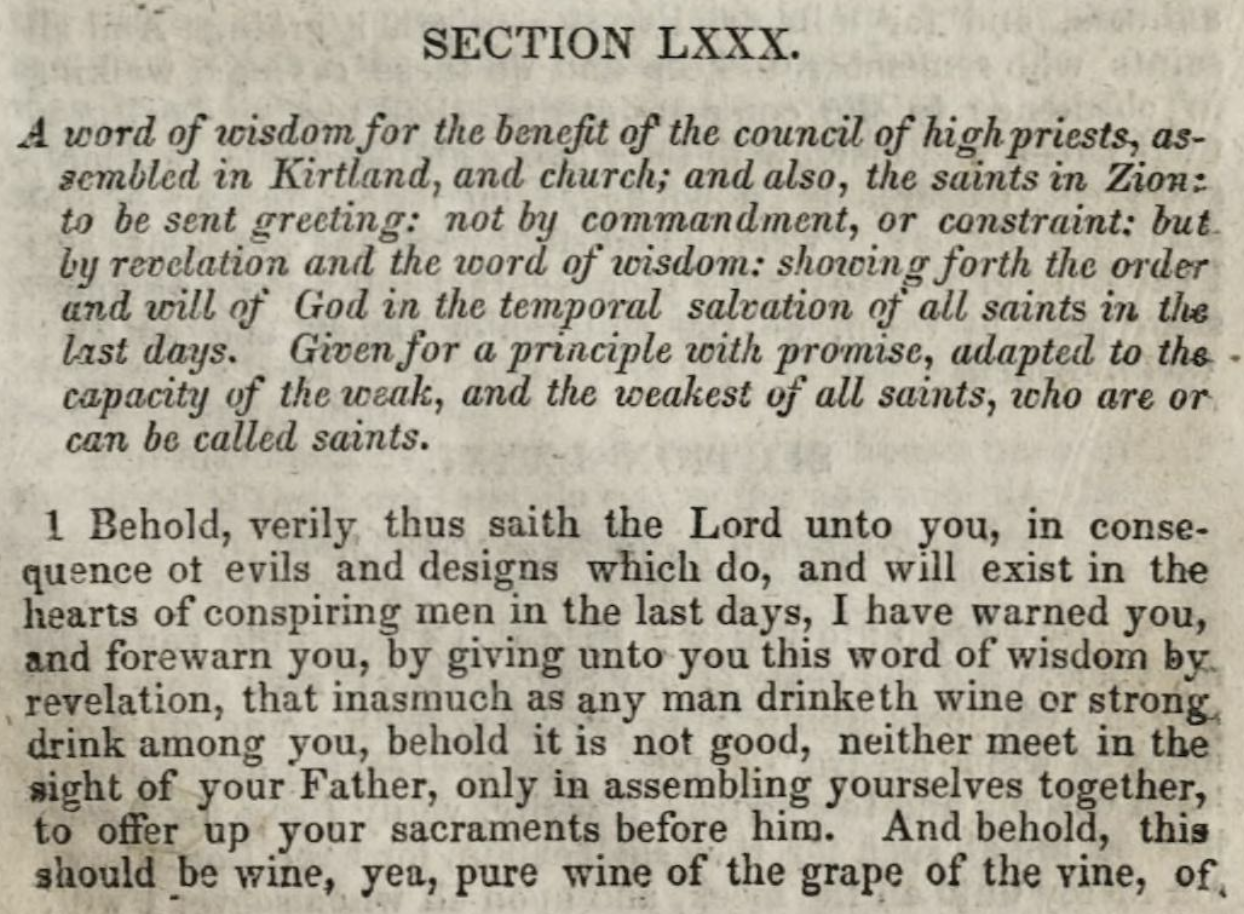
- As Section LXXX (80) in the 1835 edition of the Doctrine and Covenants
- Book: Doctrine and Covenants
- Category: Revelation

The "Word of Wisdom" is the common name of an 1833 section of the Doctrine and Covenants, a book considered by many churches within the Latter Day Saint movement to be a sacred text. The section defines beliefs regarding certain drugs, nutritious ingredients in general, and the counsel to eat meat sparingly; it also offers promises to those who follow the guidance of the Word of Wisdom.

As practiced by the Church of Jesus Christ of Latter-day Saints (LDS Church), the largest Latter Day Saint denomination, the Word of Wisdom explicitly prohibits the consumption of alcohol, tobacco, tea, coffee (with tea and coffee being labeled as "hot drinks"), and recreational drug use, and encourages healthy practices such as nutritious eating, the sparing consumption of meat, regular exercise, proper hygiene, and getting sufficient rest.

Compliance with the Word of Wisdom is necessary in the LDS Church to become a member and participate in various church functions, but a violation of the code is not normally cause for a church membership council.

== History ==
=== Background ===
The movement to discourage or ban the consumption of alcohol, the temperance movement, first began in the United States with a temperance group founded Connecticut in 1789. By 1826 there were several temperance publications and ubiquitous local temperance groups that founded a national organization.

Out of the temperance movement grew a larger clean living movement from the 1830s to the 1860s. Popular health reformers such as Sylvester Graham and William Alcott emphasized further reforms such as vegetarianism, fresh air, and elimination of tobacco, sugar, coffee and spices from the diet. These were believed to bring about physiological and psychological health benefits.

=== Beginnings under Joseph Smith ===
Joseph Smith, founder of the Latter Day Saint movement, dictated the Word of Wisdom as a revelation from God on February 27, 1833. The Word of Wisdom was first published as a stand-alone broadsheet in December 1833. In 1835, it was included as Section LXXX (80) in the first edition of the Doctrine and Covenants. Brigham Young stated after Smith's death that the revelation was given in response to problems encountered while conducting meetings in the Smith family home:

When they assembled together in this room after breakfast, the first they did was to light their pipes, and, while smoking, talk about the great things of the kingdom, and spit all over the room, and as soon as the pipe was out of their mouths a large chew of tobacco would then be taken. Often when the Prophet [Joseph Smith] entered the room to give the school instructions he would find himself in a cloud of tobacco smoke. This, and the complaints of his wife at having to clean so filthy a floor, made the Prophet think upon the matter, and he inquired of the Lord relating to the conduct of the Elders in using tobacco, and the revelation known as the Word of Wisdom was the result of his inquiry.

— Brigham Young, Journal of Discourses, vol. 12, p. 158

In February 1834, Joseph Smith proposed a resolution before the high council of the church that stated, "No official member in this Church is worthy to hold an office after having the word of wisdom properly taught him; and he, the official member, neglecting to comply with and obey it." This resolution was accepted unanimously by the council. The charge of "not observing the Word of Wisdom" was later one of five leveled against David Whitmer (who was an apostle, and one of the Three Witnesses) on April 13, 1838, which led to his excommunication.

Joseph Smith is however recorded at various times drinking wine, beer, and tea, and using tobacco. One account by Amasa Lyman, a member of the First Presidency under Smith, reports that Smith once finished preaching a sermon on the Word of Wisdom and immediately afterward rode through the streets smoking a cigar. Similarly, Almon W. Babbitt stated "that he had taken the liberty to break the Word of Wisdom, from the example of President Joseph Smith, Jun., and others, but acknowledged that it was wrong" when he was brought before the church's high council on August 19, 1835, on the charge of "not keeping the Word of Wisdom". Joseph Smith had also been operating a hotel/tavern in Far West, Missouri, in 1838, and in June of that year, the high council of Far West felt compelled to remind Smith's family that there was a ban on the sale and consumption of "ardent spirits in the place".

=== Post-succession crisis ===
==== In the LDS Church ====
After Smith's death, several factions emerged from the Latter Day Saint movement. The largest of these groups, the LDS Church, was led by Brigham Young. At a church general conference on September 9, 1851, Young called on the attendees to "leave off the use of" items mentioned in the Word of Wisdom:

The Patriarch [John Smith] again rose to speak on the Word of Wisdom, and urging on the brethren to leave off using tobacco, &c.

President Young rose to put the motion and called on all the sisters who will leave off the use of tea, coffee, &c., to manifest it by raising the right hand; seconded and carried.

And then put the following motion; calling on all the boys [sic] who were under ninety years of age who would covenant to leave off the use of tobacco, whisky, and all things mentioned in the Word of Wisdom, to manifest it in the same manner, which was carried unanimously."

The Patriarch then said, may the Lord bless you and help you to keep all your covenants. Amen.

President Young amongst other things said he knew the goodness of the people, and the Lord bears with our weakness; we must serve the Lord, and those who go with me will keep the Word of Wisdom, and if the High Priests, the Seventies, the Elders, and others will not serve the Lord, we will sever them from the Church. I will draw the line, and know who is for the Lord and who is not, and those who will not keep the Word of Wisdom, I will cut off from the Church; I throw out a challenge to all men and women.

Though Young encouraged Mormons to follow the Word of Wisdom code, the church was tolerant of those who did not follow it. In 1860, Young counseled those chewing tobacco in church meetings to at least be discreet and not excessive, but did not charge users with sin. By 1870, he ended the practice of chewing and spitting tobacco in the Salt Lake Tabernacle.

Young also recognized a separation between using tobacco (which was discouraged), and selling it to non-Mormons as a business (which was encouraged). He also owned and maintained a bar in Salt Lake City for the sale of alcoholic beverages to non-Mormon travelers, on the theory that it was better for LDS Church authorities to run such establishments than for outsiders.

The modern LDS application of the Word of Wisdom has its beginnings in the presidency of Joseph F. Smith, who became LDS Church president in 1901 at a time when even notable church leaders drank alcohol and coffee. For example, George Albert Smith, apostle and later church president, "took brandy for medicinal reasons", Anthon H. Lund, First Counselor in the First Presidency, "enjoyed Danish beer and currant wine", Charles W. Penrose, Second Counselor in the First Presidency, "occasionally served wine", Matthias F. Cowley, apostle, "enjoyed Danish beer and currant wine", Brigham Young, Jr. and John Henry Smith, both apostles, argued in 1901 "that the Church ought not interdict beer, or at least not Danish beer", and Emmeline B. Wells, of the Relief Society presidency (and who was later president of the Relief Society), "drank an occasional cup of coffee". As church president, Joseph F. Smith emphasized the proscriptions on alcohol, tobacco, tea, and coffee, while minimizing the emphasis on abstaining from meat. Adherence was still however not a prerequisite for entry into the temple, and in 1902 Smith encouraged stake presidents to be liberal when issuing temple recommends with old men who used tobacco and old ladies who drank tea. Of those who violated the revelation, it was mainly habitual drunkards that were excluded from the temple.

In 1921, LDS Church president Heber J. Grant finally made adherence to the Word of Wisdom a prerequisite for temple admission. Then, both the 1928 and 1934 editions of the Handbook—but not previous editions—listed "liquor drinking" and "bootlegging" among the "transgressions which are ordinarily such as to justify consideration by the bishop's court." To these the 1934 edition also added "drunkenness". Violation of the Word of Wisdom is however not currently (any longer) cause for church discipline.

== Popular application ==
Adherence to the Word of Wisdom in the LDS Church is required for baptism and participation in the church (such as entry into the temple, full-time missionary service, and attendance at church schools), however the church instructs its leaders that violation of the Word of Wisdom is not normally cause for a church membership council and that church discipline "should not be [used] to discipline or threaten members who do not comply with the Word of Wisdom".

A 2019 study of attitudes among Mormons within the U.S. said that a quarter to a half of such individuals interpret the Word of Wisdom in variance with the official interpretation by the LDS Church in some manner, and LDS Church leaders have counseled church members that they should not have personal interpretations of, or become extreme in their observance of the Word of Wisdom. One church leader specifically warned that adding additional unauthorized requirements, emphasizing it with excess zeal, or making it a "gospel hobby" is a sign of spiritual immaturity and sometimes apostasy.

=== Alcohol ===
LDS Church leaders teach that consumption of any form of alcohol, including beer, violates the Word of Wisdom, however, wine was used in the sacrament, and "mild drinks" (beers) were originally allowed.

=== Cannabis ===
In August 1915, the LDS Church banned the use of cannabis (also known as marijuana) by its members, and two months later the state of Utah banned cannabis. Some scholars have linked the two events, arguing that cannabis usage by Mormon returnees who had earlier fled to Mexico led the church, and later the state, to make their decisions. Others contradict this, noting that Utah's prohibition laws were part of a larger package of anti-drug laws which happened to include cannabis, but did not indicate a statewide concern. The decriminalization effort in 1971 was said to be strong in Utah due to the state's high rate of use of cannabis, and the preference of Latter-day Saints to handle matters within the church and family.

As medical and recreational cannabis decriminalization movements began in the late twentieth and early twenty-first century in the United States, the LDS Church has sought to influence "appropriate" legal resolutions on medical cannabis. In a 2010 conference for local church leaders in Colorado, general authorities of the church explained in answer to a question that the church has no position on medical marijuana and that the issue was left to individual consultation with scriptures and a member's bishop. This same stance was later reiterated in a private discussion among the Quorum of the Twelve Apostles in a 2010 video that was made public in 2016. The discussion included consensus that the church opposed recreational marijuana use more broadly but had no position on medical use specifically.

In February 2016, the church released a statement supporting efforts to legalize CBD oil in Utah, but not whole-plant cannabis remedies. The statement said that, "the Church understands that there are some individuals who may benefit from the medical use of compounds found in marijuana" and that it opposes SB 73. In October 2016, the church's First Presidency sent a letter to congregations in California, Nevada, and Arizona (states which were to vote on legalized recreational cannabis in November), urging members to oppose recreational legalization. A 2019 article in the church's youth magazine New Era warned against marijuana use and stated medical marijuana should only be used "under the care of a competent physician".

=== Tobacco ===
In the LDS Church, tobacco is not allowed in any form, including smoking, chewing, or vaping.

=== Tea and coffee ===
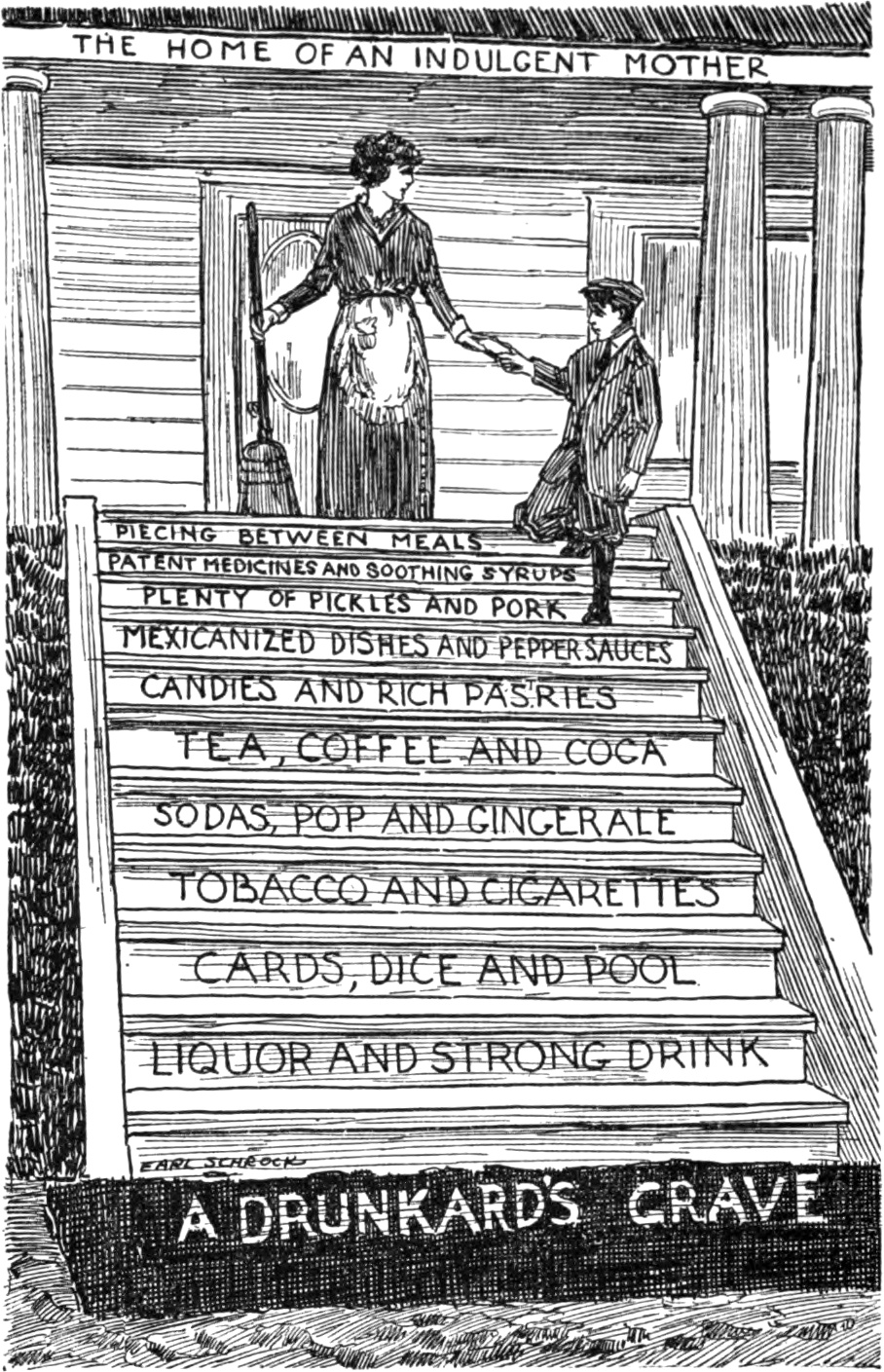
A non-Mormon 1915 temperance movement cartoon, illustrating the concept of hot drinks as a gateway to worse vice.

The LDS Church prohibits tea and coffee, as interpreted from the mention of "hot drinks" in the scripture; it teaches that it does not matter whether or not the drinks are hot. It has not taken a clear position on decaffeinated tea or coffee.

There is generally thought to be no prohibition against drinking herbal tea, coffee substitutes such as Pero and Postum, hot chocolate, malt drinks such as Ovaltine and Milo, mate, or hot water.

==== Definition of the term "hot drinks" ====
"Hot drinks" is clarified for the LDS Church handbook:

The only official interpretation of "hot drinks" (D&C 89:9) in the Word of Wisdom is the statement made by early Church leaders that the term "hot drinks" means tea and coffee.

In 1842, Smith's brother Hyrum, who was the Assistant President of the Church and its presiding patriarch, provided an interpretation of the Word of Wisdom's proscription of "hot drinks":

And again "hot drinks are not for the body, or belly;" there are many who wonder what this can mean; whether it refers to tea, or coffee, or not. I say it does refer to tea, and coffee.

According to a book written by LDS missionary and hymnographer Joel H. Johnson in 1881, Joseph Smith shared Hyrum's interpretation:

I understand that some of the people are excusing themselves in using tea and coffee, because the Lord only said "hot drinks" in the revelation of the Word of Wisdom .... Tea and coffee ... are what the Lord meant when He said "hot drinks".

=== Cola and other caffeinated beverages ===
Since 2011, LDS Church leaders have had no official position on ingesting caffeine, but church publications have made conflicting statements throughout the church's history. A longstanding issue among members of the LDS Church is whether it is permissible to ingest drinks containing caffeine that are not tea or coffee. In 1918, Frederick J. Pack, a Mormon professor at the University of Utah, published an article in an official church magazine in which he reasoned that because Coca-Cola contained caffeine, which is also present in tea and coffee, Mormons should abstain from Coca-Cola in the same way that they abstain from the Word of Wisdom "hot drinks". Since Pack's article, many Mormons have come to believe that the reason tea and coffee are proscribed is the presence of caffeine in the drinks. However, the church has never stated that this is the reason for the prohibition.

The church does not have an official position on the consumption of caffeinated beverages, apart from the general statement that the Word of Wisdom does not specifically mention it. In 2012, in response to a report on Mormonism on NBC's Rock Center with Brian Williams, which stated that LDS faithful were prohibited from drinking caffeine, the church wrote, "the church revelation spelling out health practices ... does not mention the use of caffeine."

In the past, a number of church leaders have discouraged the use of such products. For example, in 1922, church president Heber J. Grant counseled the Latter-day Saints:

I am not going to give any command, but I will ask it as a personal, individual favor to me, to let coca-cola [sic] alone. There are plenty of other things you can get at the soda fountains without drinking that which is injurious. The Lord does not want you to use any drug that creates an appetite for itself.

Two years after making this statement, Grant met with a representative of The Coca-Cola Company to discuss the church's position on Coca-Cola; at the conclusion of their second meeting, Grant stated that he was "sure I have not the slightest desire to recommend that the people leave Coca-Cola alone if th[e] amount [of caffeine in Coca-Cola] is absolutely harmless, which they claim it is." Grant never again spoke out against the use of cola drinks.

Approximately fifty years later, the church issued an official statement which stated:

With reference to cola drinks, the Church has never officially taken a position on this matter, but the leaders of the Church have advised, and we do now specifically advise, against the use of any drink containing harmful habit-forming drugs under circumstances that would result in acquiring the habit. Any beverage that contains ingredients harmful to the body should be avoided.

Because of such statements, some adherents believe that caffeine is officially prohibited under the Word of Wisdom. In the mid-1950s, the director of the food services for Brigham Young University, a college owned by the LDS Church, decided not to sell caffeine on campus. This changed in September 2017 when BYU announced that caffeinated beverages would be sold on campus stating it was due to a change in responding to student requests. Official church publications have occasionally published articles by medical practitioners that warn of the health risks of consuming caffeine. In November 2010,The Salt Lake Tribune stated that in the 2010 church Handbook, which sets out the official position of the church on health and social issues, no position on drinking Coca-Cola or caffeinated drinks was included. The Salt Lake Tribune concluded that the church "takes no official position on caffeine".

=== Meat ===
The Word of Wisdom states that "flesh also of beasts and of the fowls of the air ... are to be used sparingly", and that "it is pleasing unto [God] that they should not be used, only in times of winter, or of cold, or famine."

Many LDS Church leaders have expressed their views on the subject of meat. In 1868, church president Brigham Young counseled, "Flesh should be used sparingly, in famine and in cold." In 1868, apostle George Q. Cannon said, "We are told that flesh of any kind is not suitable to man in the summer time, and ought to be eaten sparingly in the winter." From 1897 to 1901, apostle and then church president Lorenzo Snow repeatedly emphasized the importance of eating meat sparingly, teaching that church members should refrain from eating meat except in case of dire necessity, and that this should be seen in light of Smith's teaching that animals have spirits. In 1895, Snow stated, "Unless famine or extreme cold is upon us we should refrain from the use of meat." Apostle George Teasdale taught the same thing, and held that eating pork was a more serious breach of the Word of Wisdom than drinking tea or coffee. When Joseph F. Smith succeeded Snow as president of the church in 1901, he preached regularly against the "unnecessary destruction of life", and emphasized kindness to animals and the important stewardship humans have toward them.

Despite these statements, restricting meat consumption was not given an explicit mention for worthiness in the LDS Church as the standards for obedience to the Word of Wisdom were made increasingly central to LDS Church doctrine and practice in the early 20th century. The increased emphasis on the Word of Wisdom took place during the presidency of Heber J. Grant, a long-time enthusiastic promoter of the Word of Wisdom. Although Grant did not emphasize restricting meat consumption, he continued to interpret it as part of the counsel in the Word of Wisdom. In the 1937 General Conference, at 80 years old, Grant said he worked long hours "without fatigue and without feeling the least injury". He attributed his excellent health, in part, to eating very little meat.

In a 1948 LDS general conference address, apostle Joseph F. Merrill emphasized the importance of not eating meat as "freely as many Americans are doing". In 1950, apostle and plant scientist John A. Widtsoe wrote, in relation to meat consumption, "they who wish to be well and gain the promised reward stated in the Word of Wisdom must obey all of the law, not just part of it as suits their whim or their appetite, or their notion of its meaning." As recently as 2012, official church spokesperson Michael Otterson stated "the church has also encouraged limiting meat consumption in favor of grains, fruits and vegetables.

To this day, the LDS Church's hymnal includes a hymn (In Our Lovely Deseret) with the following lyrics:

That the children may live long / And be beautiful and strong, / Tea and coffee and tobacco they despise, / Drink no liquor, and they eat / But a very little meat; / They are seeking to be great and good and wise.

A student manual published by the church has suggested that limiting the consumption of meat to the wintertime may be to some degree of the time in which the "Word of Wisdom" was delivered by Smith:

This verse has caused some to ask if meat should be eaten in the summer. Meat has more calories than fruits and vegetables, which some individuals may need fewer of in summer than winter. Also, before fruits and vegetables could be preserved, people often did not have enough other food to eat in winter. Spoiled meat can be fatal if eaten, and in former times meat spoiled more readily in summer than winter. Modern methods of refrigeration now make it possible to preserve meat in any season. The key word with respect to the use of meat is sparingly.

=== Refined grain products ===
In a pamphlet written in 1930 called The Word of Wisdom, LDS Church apostle John A. Widtsoe taught that refined flour was contrary to the Word of Wisdom. The church, however, has never prohibited the use of refined flour.

=== Other areas ===
Speculation exists concerning the use of alcohol as a cooking ingredient or "alcohol-free" varieties of drinks. The LDS Church has taken no official stance on either.

== Enstrom study regarding members of the LDS Church ==
A 14-year selective study conducted by UCLA epidemiologist James E. Enstrom tracked the health of 10,000 moderately active LDS Church members in California and ended in 1987.

Of these non-smoking, monogamous non-drinkers, Enstrom concluded from the study "that LDS Church members who follow religious mandates barring smoking and drinking have one of the lowest death rates, including from cancer and cardiovascular diseases—close to half that of the general population. ... Moreover, the healthiest LDS Church members enjoy a life expectancy eight to eleven years longer than that of the general white population in the United States." For LDS high priests who exercised, had proper sleep, and never smoked cigarettes, the mortality rate was even lower.

The results were largely duplicated in a separate study of an LDS-like subgroup of white non-smoking churchgoers in Alameda County, California.

== See also ==
- Alcoholism
- Christian dietary laws
- Flexitarianism
- Health effects of caffeine
- Health effects of coffee
- Health effects of tea
- Health effects of tobacco
- LDS Church views on cannabis
- List of diets
- Long-term effects of alcohol consumption
- Substance use disorder
- Cannabis and religion
- Religion and drugs

== Bibliography ==
- Alexander, Thomas G. (Autumn 1981), "The Word of Wisdom: From Principle to Requirement", Dialogue: A Journal of Mormon Thought, 14 (3): 78–88, doi:10.2307/45224999, JSTOR 45224999, archived from the original on July 3, 2010
- Alexander, Thomas G. (1996), "The Adoption of a New Interpretation of the Word of Wisdom", Mormonism in Transition, Urbana: University of Illinois Press, pp. 258–71, ISBN 978-0-252-06578-1
- Blakesley, Katie Clark (2004). 'Sin is Creeping in Among us': The Fight to Save the Youth and the 1921 Anti-cigarette Campaign (Thesis). Master's thesis. Salt Lake City: University of Utah.
- Bush, Lester E. Jr. (1981), "The Word of Wisdom in Early Nineteenth-Century Perspective", Dialogue: A Journal of Mormon Thought, 14 (3): 46–65, doi:10.2307/45224997, JSTOR 45224997, PMID 11614401; reprinted in Vogel, Dan, ed. (1990), The Word of God: Essays on Mormon Scripture, Signature Books, p. 161
- Enstrom, James E. (1989), "Health practices and cancer mortality among active California Mormons", Journal of the National Cancer Institute, 81 (23): 1807–14, doi:10.1093/jnci/81.23.1807, PMID 2585528
- Ford, Clyde D. (Fall 1998), "The Origin of the Word of Wisdom", Journal of Mormon History, 24 (2): 129–54
- Hoskisson, Paul Y. (Fall 2009), "Different and Unique: The Word of Wisdom in the Historical, Cultural, and Social Settings of the 1830s", Mormon Historical Studies, 10 (2): 41–61
- Larson, Stan (1988), "Synoptic Minutes of a Quarterly Conference of the Twelve Apostles: The Clawson and Lund Diaries of July 9–11, 1901", Journal of Mormon History, 14: 97–119
- McCue, Robert J. (1981), "Did the Word of Wisdom Become a Commandment in 1851?", Dialogue: A Journal of Mormon Thought, 14 (3): 66–77, doi:10.2307/45224998, JSTOR 45224998, PMID 11614402
- Merrill, Ray M.; Lindsay, Gordon B.; Lyon, Joseph L. (1999), "Tobacco-Related Cancers in Utah Compared to the United States: Quantifying the Benefits of the Word of Wisdom", BYU Studies, 38 (4): 91–105, archived from the original on June 26, 2010
- Peterson, Paul H. (1972). An Historical Analysis of the Word of Wisdom (Master's thesis). Provo, UT: Department of History, Brigham Young University.
- Peterson, Paul H.; Walker, Ronald W. (2003), "Brigham Young's World of Wisdom Legacy", BYU Studies, 42 (3–4): 29–64, archived from the original on June 26, 2010
- Smith, Joseph Jr. (1835), "A Word of Wisdom", in Smith, Joseph Jr.; Cowdery, Oliver; Rigdon, Sidney; Williams, Frederick G. (eds.), Doctrine and Covenants of the Church of the Latter Day Saints: Carefully Selected from the Revelations of God, Kirtland, Ohio: F. G. Williams & Co, pp. 207–08 (section LXXX), archived from the original on 2012-09-03
- "Special Collection: Word of Wisdom Education Committee papers (MSS 44)". archives.lib.byu.edu. L. Tom Perry Special Collections: Harold B. Lee Library.
- Thompson, Brent G. (1983), "'Standing between Two Fires': Mormons and Prohibition, 1908–1917", Journal of Mormon History, 10: 35–52, archived from the original on June 13, 2011
- McKellar, Katie (February 12, 2016), "Research and control at center of marijuana debate; LDS Church issues new statement", Deseret News, archived from the original on February 14, 2016
- Margolin, Madison (March 8, 2016), "How Mormons Are Leading Utah's Fight for Medical Marijuana: The church presents a tricky obstacle for patients and advocates in this deeply conservative state", Vice
- Fertig, Natalie (June 9, 2021), "How the Mormon church unlocked medical pot for deep red states", Politico
