= C11H12O4 =

The molecular formula C_{11}H_{12}O_{4} (molar mass: 208.21 g/mol, exact mass: 208.073559 u) may refer to:

- 3,4-Dimethoxycinnamic acid
- Ethyl caffeate, a hydroxycinnamic acid ethyl ester
- Macrophomic acid
- Sinapaldehyde
- 6-Methoxymellein
