= Peaberry Coffee =

US coffee shop chain

Peaberry Coffee was a coffee shop chain that was started in Denver, Colorado, in 1990 by Bill Tointon. The store's concept was founded on serving a variety of coffee from all over the world and roasting it in Denver. It was categorized in a menu format called the "Peaberry Profile System". The system offered four selections of coffee roasting styles: Light & Mild, Rich & Creamy, Extravagant & Exotic and Dark & Intense.

In 2006, a lawsuit was brought against Peaberry Coffee and Perkins Coie (Peaberry's franchise attorneys). Ten franchisees claimed to have lost millions of dollars due to Peaberry's poor financial practices and alleged that the company had not shown a profit since 1998. They further claimed that most of the stores owned by the company failed to break even. The franchisees also stopped paying royalties in February 2008. A Denver district judge ruled against the franchisees later that year and also decided that they owed the unpaid royalties to Peaberry. The franchisees are appealing the ruling.

In September 2009, Peaberry Coffee, Inc. closed all of its corporate owned locations. Several stores which were previously franchises are now operated independently. These stores include: the Denver Tech Center location, the Park Meadows location, the Arapahoe location, and the Boulder location. The closures were due to poor financial performance from the stores, a poor economy, and the cost of the lawsuit brought against the company by franchisees.

In February 2010, the Colorado Court of Appeals vacated judgment against Plaintiffs for unpaid royalties, attorneys fees and restored the fraudulent concealment claim against Peaberry. On remand in 2011, the trial court again ruled in Peaberry's favor and resolved the inconsistencies concerning the fraudulent concealment claim the Colorado Court of Appeals noted in its first ruling. The franchisees appealed again, and on July 26, 2012, the Colorado Court of Appeals affirmed the trial court's ruling for Peaberry concluding that Plaintiffs failed to prove Peaberry defrauded them.

The store was named after the peaberry coffee bean. A "peaberry" is a small, round coffee bean that has unique taste characteristics and makes up only 2–4% of the harvest depending on the crop.

== See also ==
- List of coffeehouse chains
