= Furanocoumarin 8-methyltransferase =

Furanocoumarin 8-methyltransferase may refer to:

- 8-hydroxyfuranocoumarin 8-O-methyltransferase
- Nicotinate N-methyltransferase
