= List of chemical compounds in coffee =

There are more than 1,000 chemical compounds in coffee, and their molecular and physiological effects are areas of active research in food chemistry.

== Overview ==
There are a large number of ways to organize coffee compounds. The major texts in the area variously sort by effects on flavor, physiology, pre- and post-roasting effects, growing and processing effects, botanical variety differences, country of origin differences, and many others. Interactions between chemical compounds also is a frequent area of taxonomy, as are the major organic chemistry categories (protein, carbohydrate, lipid, etc.) that are relevant to the field. In the field of aroma and flavor alone, Flament gives a list of 300 contributing chemicals in green beans, and over 850 after roasting. He lists 16 major categories to cover those compounds related to aroma and flavor.

The chemical complexity of coffee is emerging, especially due to observed physiological effects which cannot be related only to the presence of caffeine. Moreover, coffee contains an exceptionally substantial amount of antioxidants such as chlorogenic acids, hydroxycinnamic acids, caffeine and Maillard reaction products, such as melanoidins. Chemical groups, such as alkaloids and caffeoylquinic acids, are common insecticides; their effects on coffee quality and flavor have been investigated in most studies. Although health effects are certainly a valid taxonomy category, less than 30 of the over 1,000 compounds have been subjected to juried, health-related research (e.g. official potential carcinogen classification — see furans, for example), so health categorization has been avoided.

On the other hand, physiological effects are well documented in some (e.g. stimulant effects of caffeine), and those are listed where they are relevant and well-documented. Internet claims for individual chemicals, or compound synergies, such as preventing dental cavities (speculative but unproven effect of the alkaloid trigonelline with in vitro bacterial attachment research, but missing in vivo research on any health effects), preventing kidney stones, or negative effects, also have been avoided.

== Groups ==
Chemicals found in coffee can be categorized in the following groups:

=== Acids and anhydrides ===
Quinic acid, 3,5-Di-caffeoylquinic acid

=== Alkaloids ===
Caffeine, Putrescine, Theophylline, Trigonelline

=== Alcohols ===
Quinic acid, Acetoin

=== Amines ===
- Harmane
- Norharman

=== Esters ===
3,5-Di-caffeoylquinic acid

=== Fiber ===
Coffee is known to have a significant amount of water-soluble dietary fiber (mostly polysaccharides like galactomannans, arabinogalactans, and melanoidins) compared to other commonly consumed beverages such as factory orange juice. The amount of dietary fiber ranges from 0.47-0.75 g per 100 mL of prepared coffee in a 2007 experiment testing on espresso, drip coffee, and freeze-dried coffee with the beverage made from freeze-dried containing the highest amount fiber. Given the popularity of coffee and the low amount of fiber consumed by the average person in many developed nations, coffee may majorly contribute to the daily dietary fiber consumption for many people. (For instance, in Spain the mean fiber consumption of 7 grams per day with a moderate coffee drinker having 3 cups per day points to coffee accounting for 10% of Spanish dietary fiber.)

=== Ketones ===
Acetoin

=== Organosulfuric compounds ===
Dimethyl disulfide

=== Phenols ===
3,5-Di-caffeoylquinic acid

=== Triglycerides ===
- Commonly called coffee oils. Ester bonded Glycerol with three hydroxyl (OH-) groups connected to fatty acids, each having its own carboxyl group

== See also ==
- Cafestol
- Kahweol
