= Cannabis in Utah =

Cannabis in Utah is illegal for recreational use. Possession of small amounts is punishable as a misdemeanor crime. Medical use was legalized by ballot measure in November 2018, after a CBD-only law was passed in 2014 and a limited "right to try" law was passed in March 2018.

== Prohibition (1915) ==
Utah is frequently cited as the first state to explicitly ban cannabis, which they did in 1915, though other scholars state that California was actually the first, in 1913, and that Utah's claim to be first is based on a misunderstanding of California's earlier law and the lack of public attention its passing received. Scholar David E. Newton notes that Utah law is an area of controversy among cannabis historians: some scholars believe the law was a reaction to cannabis usage by Mormon returnees from Mexico following the 1910 revolution, and based on an August 1915 prohibition on cannabis by the Church of Jesus Christ of Latter-day Saints (LDS Church). Other scholars however note that cannabis was simply not an issue of public attention in Utah during that period, and submit that Utah simply banned cannabis as part of a larger anti-drug legislation based on earlier California law, rather than as a response to any cannabis situation in Utah.

== CBD legalization (2014) ==
In March 2014, House Bill 105 was signed by Governor Gary Herbert, legalizing possession and use of low-THC CBD oil by registered patients with a physician's recommendation and intractable epilepsy. However, the bill included no provision for patients to legally acquire the oil.

== Medical cannabis legislation ==
=== 2015 ===
Senate Bill 259 was a proposed by Senator Mark B. Madsen (Republican, Saratoga Springs) with eight working days left in the legislative session. Under the bill, those with AIDS, Alzheimer's disease, amyotrophic lateral sclerosis, an autoimmune disorder, cachexia or physical wasting, nausea, or malnutrition associated with chronic disease, cancer, Crohn's disease, epilepsy, or a condition that causes debilitating seizures, glaucoma, multiple sclerosis or a similar condition that causes persistent and debilitating muscle spasms, post-traumatic stress disorder, or severe, chronic pain would be able to use medical marijuana legally.

The bill was defeated in the Senate on a 15–14 vote, with several senators citing the relative rush behind the bill as the reason for their no vote. Madsen stated that he would try again in the 2016 session.

=== 2016 ===
In 2016, Senator Madsen again attempted to pass legislation legalizing the use of medical cannabis through Senate Bill 73. The legislation would have allowed medicinal use for a host of ailments including HIV, AIDS, Alzheimer's disease, amyotrophic lateral sclerosis, cancer, cachexia, or such condition manifest by physical wasting, nausea, or malnutrition associated with chronic disease, Crohn's disease or a similar gastrointestinal disorder, epilepsy or a similar condition that causes debilitating seizures, multiple sclerosis or a similar condition that causes persistent and debilitating muscle spasms, post-traumatic stress disorder related to military service; and chronic pain in an individual. The legislation also put into place a more robust cultivation, tracking, distribution, and enforcement models in direct response to this lacking information in the 2015 bill and advocated for whole plant usage.

During debate on the bill in the Senate, Madsen made several concessions and amendments. The bill eventually passed the Senate 17-12. The House Health and Human Services Committee, however, failed to pass the bill out of committee along a 4-8 vote.

Madsen did not attempt to revive the legislation, and he chose not to run for reelection in 2016.

Also during 2016, Senator Evan Vickers (Republican, Cedar City) proposed Senate Bill 89. Vickers' legislation would expand the use of low-THC CBD oil (as opposed to whole plant use) to additional illnesses and also put into place cultivation, tracking, distribution, and enforcement models, but would also include provisions for product testing and research. The legislation would pass the Senate 18-8 and the House Health and Human Services Committee by a vote of 7-5. The full House, however, did not consider the bill.

Finally, Senator Brian Shiozawa (Republican, Salt Lake City) successfully passed Senate Concurrent Resolution 11. This non-binding resolution unanimously passed the Senate and House and urges Congress to reclassify marijuana as a Schedule II drug, thereby allowing study of the drug for medicinal purposes.

=== 2018 ===
In February 2018, the Utah House of Representatives passed HB 195, a bill to legalize the "right to try" and grow medical marijuana plants for terminally ill patients. On March 7, the bill was passed "easily" by the state senate, and on March 21, the governor signed it into law.

On November 6, 2018, The Utah Medical Cannabis Act was passed as ballot Proposition 2. Provisions must be set by the state for dispensaries to open by January 2021.

On December 3, 2018, the Utah Legislature passed HB3001, amending the Utah Medical Cannabis Act as passed through Proposition 2. The Governor signed HB3001 into law later the same day, causing it to go into immediate effect.

== 2016 gubernatorial race ==
In April 2016, police visited the home of Democratic gubernatorial candidate Mike Weinholtz, and seized medical marijuana belonging to his wife Donna. This occurred days before Weinholtz's acceptance of his party's nomination. Local authorities opted to pursue misdemeanor possession charges against Donna Weinholtz, and federal authorities chose not to pursue charges. Donna Weinholtz used medical marijuana to treat pain from arthritis and a degenerative spinal condition In October 2016, she pled guilty to misdemeanor possession, agreeing to a fine and probation. During a news conference, Mike Weinholtz called for reform of Utah's medical marijuana system.

== See also ==
- Cannabis and Latter-day Saints
