= Medical claims on The Dr. Oz Show =

American daytime TV show

The Dr. Oz Show is an American daytime television syndicated talk series that aired between September 14, 2009, and January 14, 2022. The host of the show is Dr. Mehmet Oz, a cardiothoracic surgeon who developed an affinity for alternative medicine. Throughout its run, various episodes and segment features have been vastly criticized for a lack of scientific credibility about the medical claims on the show. A 2014 study concluded that less than half the claims made on The Dr. Oz Show were backed by "some" evidence, and that fell to a third when the threshold was raised to "believable" evidence. The website Science-Based Medicine goes even further, claiming: "No other show on television can top The Dr. Oz Show for the sheer magnitude of bad health advice it consistently offers, all while giving everything a veneer of credibility." What follows is a selection of claims lacking scientific evidence.

== Vaccines ==
On January 4, 2010, Oz endorsed spacing out childhood vaccines, a common anti-vaccine trope based on the false premise that the immune systems of children are incapable of responding to multiple vaccines at once, and said that his children had not been vaccinated against H1N1. He also expressed suggestions that MMR vaccination may be linked to autism, infamously based on a fraudulent paper by Andrew Wakefield. However, in 2019, Oz endorsed MMR vaccination and encouraged his viewers to vaccinate themselves and their children against mumps, measles, and rubella.

== Arsenic in apple juice ==
In September 2011, Oz drew criticism for an episode on the alleged dangers of arsenic in apple juice. Oz hired an independent toxicology laboratory, EMSL, and found arsenic levels in some samples to be above the limit the U.S. Food and Drug Administration (FDA) allows in drinking water. The FDA said "there is currently no evidence to suggest a public health risk", and criticized the emphasis on measurements of total arsenic without distinguishing between harmless organic arsenic compounds and toxic inorganic arsenic compounds that pose differing levels of health risk.

Consumer Reports conducted similar tests on samples of apple and grape juices around the same time. Unlike the tests done by Oz, Consumer Reports tested for both organic and inorganic types of arsenic. Results showed that 6% (5 out of 80) of the samples tested by Consumer Reports exceeded the 10-parts-per-billion (ppb) federal limit for arsenic in drinking water. When counting only inorganic arsenic, one of the 80 apple juice samples tested slightly exceeded 10-parts-per-billion limit, at 10.48 ppb. The limits only apply to arsenic levels for drinking water; there are no legal limits for arsenic in fruit juices. After the episode aired, the FDA indicated it is continuing to research the levels of arsenic in fruit juices and other foods, and may implement limits for fruit juices in the future.

== Conversion therapy ==
An episode in November 2012 discussed conversion therapy (under a different term, 'reparative therapy') and "forms of therapy that are designed to turn a gay person straight." This therapy has been rejected by the mainstream mental health professions. The broadcast featured Julie Hamilton, a representative of the National Association for Research & Therapy of Homosexuality (NARTH, now known as the Alliance for Therapeutic Choice and Scientific Integrity), which offers conversion therapy, and also had guests who condemned it. Three of the groups who were consulted for the show — GLAAD, GLSEN, and PFLAG — issued a joint press release repudiating the episode just after it aired. The press release, calling NARTH "a splinter group of anti-gay therapists/activists", criticized the episode for starting with two segments of the show featuring proponents of conversion therapy without challenge, then introducing the NARTH representative as an "expert", and providing no opinion by Dr. Oz on the subject, which the press release authors characterized as causing the audience to be "misled to believe that there are actual experts on both sides of this issue". The press release also stated that "GLSEN would not have participated in The Dr. Oz Show had we known that NARTH would be represented".

Oz responded in a blog post, mentioning the opposition of respected medical organizations to the practice of conversion therapy, and saying that "if we want to reach everyone who might benefit from understanding the risks of this therapy, you have to present multiple perspectives." He also said that he agreed "with the established medical consensus", that he had "not found enough published data supporting positive results with gay reparative therapy", and that he was concerned about "potentially dangerous effects when the therapy fails". Oz also pointed out that "the guests who appeared on my show on either side of this debate agreed that entering into any therapy with guilt and self-hate is a major error."

== 2014 Senate hearing ==
During a Senate hearing on consumer protection, Senator Claire McCaskill stated that by airing segments on weight loss products that are later cited in advertisements, Oz plays a role, intentional or not, in perpetuating these scams, and that she is "concerned that you are melding medical advice, news, and entertainment in a way that harms consumers." Mary Engle of the U.S. Federal Trade Commission (FTC) criticized Oz for calling green coffee extract "magic" and a "miracle", stating that it is difficult for consumers to listen to their inner voices when products are praised by hosts they trust.

One of the products Oz was promoting, green coffee bean extract, was found to have absolutely no weight loss benefits. Two of the researchers who were paid to write the study admitted that they could not back their data so they retracted their paper. The FTC filed a complaint that the Texas-based company Applied Food Sciences (the promoters of the study) had falsely advertised. The FTC alleged that the study was "so hopelessly flawed that no reliable conclusions could be drawn from it" so Applied Food Sciences agreed to pay a $3.5 million settlement.

== Olive oil lawsuit ==
In November 2016, the North American Olive Oil Association, a trade group of oil packagers and importers, sued Oz for one of his segments. Oz told millions of his viewers in May 2016 that 80 percent of extra virgin oil in supermarkets may be "fake". The association claimed that Oz falsely attacked the quality and integrity of Olive Oil in supermarkets and sued him for misinformation. In the segment, Oz showed a certified olive oil expert who conducted a blind smell test of five popular Italian extra virgin olive oils, claiming that only one was authentic extra virgin oil. The expert was revealed to be an employee of the California Olive Ranch, although she was not introduced as such. The group claims that it monitors the quality of olive oil by conducting independent testing on oils taken directly from the shelves of supermarkets.

The lawsuit took place in Georgia court, one of the states in the U.S. which has a food libel law and a lower threshold of proof than a defamation allegation. The Dr. Oz Show defended its story and refuted the allegations. In March 2017, the lawsuit was dismissed. The judge noted that the association failed to show that it was financially hurt by Oz's actions and found no statements which claimed that olive oil was unsafe for human consumption.

== Miracle diet pills ==
In March 2020, a California court dismissed a lawsuit brought against Oz stating that it had misrepresented the effectiveness of "fat bursting" supplements in his show.

== Colloidal silver ==
On at least three episodes Oz promoted colloidal silver as a treatment for cold symptoms, wounds, viruses, and bacteria, but there is no evidence at all to support any medical uses of it. Despite Oz's recommendations, colloidal silver does not treat or prevent any disease or condition, and it is not proven safe to consume.
