= 16-O-Methylcafestol =

Names
- IUPAC name 16α-Methoxy-3,18-(epoxymetheno)-19-nor-5β,8α,9β,10α,13β,16β-kaur-3-en-17-ol
- Systematic IUPAC name [(3bS,5aS,7R,8R,10aR,10bS)-7-Methoxy-10b-methyl-3b,4,5,6,7,8,9,10,10a,10b,11,12-dodecahydro-5a,8-methanocyclohepta[5,6]naphtho[2,1-b]furan-7-yl]methanol

Identifiers
CAS Number	108214-28-4
3D model (JSmol)	Interactive image
ChemSpider	22901058
PubChem CID	68103163
UNII	TJ95S36BVX
CompTox Dashboard (EPA)	DTXSID30737953
- InChI: InChI=1S/C21H30O3/c1-19-8-6-17-15(7-10-24-17)16(19)5-9-20-11-14(3-4-18(19)20)21(12-20,13-22)23-2/h7,10,14,16,18,22H,3-6,8-9,11-13H2,1-2H3/t14-,16-,18+,19-,20+,21+/m1/s1 Key: BDVVNPOGDNWUOI-GVOJMRIRSA-N
- SMILES: C[C@@]12CCC3=C([C@H]1CC[C@]45[C@H]2CC[C@H](C4)[C@](C5)(CO)OC)C=CO3

Properties
Chemical formula	C_{21}H_{30}O_{3}
Molar mass	330.468 g·mol^{−1}
- Except where otherwise noted, data are given for materials in their standard state (at 25 °C [77 °F], 100 kPa). Infobox references

16-O-Methylcafestol, a derivative of cafestol, is an isolate of green coffee beans.

This derivative only occurs in the robusta variant of coffee (as opposed to the more expensive arabica, where only cafestol is present). Thus 16-O-Methylcafestol is used as an analytical marker for determining the robusta content of coffee blends.
