= Coffee: A Dark History =

2005 book by Anthony Wild

- Author: Antony Wild
- Publisher: W. W. Norton & Company
- Publication date: 2005
- Pages: 323
- ISBN: 978-0-393-06071-3
- OCLC: 57694673

Coffee: A Dark History is a 2005 book that examines the history of coffee. It was written by Antony Wild and was published by Norton. Wild had previously worked as a buyer for a specialty-coffee company for over ten years. He argues that coffee has had major effects on the economy of the British Empire. He also maintains that First World consumption of coffee and the accompanying free trade policies have had a negative impact on Third World coffee farmers.

== Summary ==
Although he is unable to determine exactly when and where coffee was first consumed, Wild believes that its effect as a stimulant was first discovered by Ethiopian farmers. He also describes its adoption by Sufi Islam and then Arab society in general. He credits coffee with causing "a revolution in... political, economic, and cultural life" in England. He addresses the relevance of coffee houses in English society, and also outlines the intellectual movement that resulted. The inherent unfairness in the coffee industry on the third world is also addressed. Wild argues in the book that the energizing effects of coffee are partially responsible for the creation of the modern stock exchange, Lloyd's of London, and the London police force in the 1600s. He believes that many British thinkers of the day would have been less prolific had they drunk ale instead of coffee. He also claims that coffee replacing ale as a popular morning beverage helped cause the Age of Enlightenment. Wild expresses the viewpoint of many women in regards to the drinking of British coffee houses. In 1674, the "Women's Petition Against Coffee" was published, stating that men were wasting their time on reflection and coffee, which took away from their time spent at home. He also notes that coffee was frequently consumed at meetings of the Royal Society and by political philosophers such as Andrew Marvell and Samuel Pepys. He also describes how nations in the Americas were able to rapidly increase coffee production in the 18th century due to the use of slavery. He states that coffee played a role that was similar to sugar in promoting the international slave trade.

Wild describes the global supply chain of coffee in detail. He quotes an estimate by the World Bank that 500 million people are involved in the global coffee trade. He notes that coffee is very cheap due to the use of Coffea canephora (robusta coffee) in Vietnam and other countries. In addition to its inexpensive price, he says that the invention of instant coffee also made the drink easier to make and thus more popular, because American soldiers in World War II. He is particularly critical of Starbucks and Nestlé, viewing them as complicit in neocolonial oppression of African farmers. Wild claims the demand for lower prices forces the farmers and workers out of business, especially in Africa and Central America. He advocates the purchase of Fair Trade coffee as a way to help Third World farmers. Wild discusses the impact big businesses have on third world coffee producing countries, including El Salvador, Brazil and Vietnam, that don't get paid as much for exporting coffee.

Wild also discusses the health effects of caffeine. He believes that excessive caffeine consumption poses a risk to human health. He also argues that the coffee industry has produced flawed information that distort the actual effects of caffeine. Although, caffeine has made coffee the popular beverage that it is today.

== Reception ==
Writing in The Washington Monthly Brendan I. Koerner faults Wild for bland, unrefined storytelling, poor logic, and off topic digressions with unnecessary detail about unimportant minutiae. Randolph Schmid of the Associated Press described the digressions as often fascinating, however. Koerner also believes that some of the claims made by Wild about the effects of coffee are outlandish. In addition, he notes that Wild departs from his discussion of coffee to dwell on subjects such as US drug policy and the Vietnam War. However, he praises Wild for eye-opening accounts of the coffee manufacturing process, descriptions of the effects of free trade, and for casting "much-needed light on the consequences of Starbucks' coffee-house hegemony". Jonathan Yardley also praised Wild for the well founded indignation and sorrow with which he describes the global coffee industry.
