= Nicotinate N-methyltransferase =

Class of enzymes

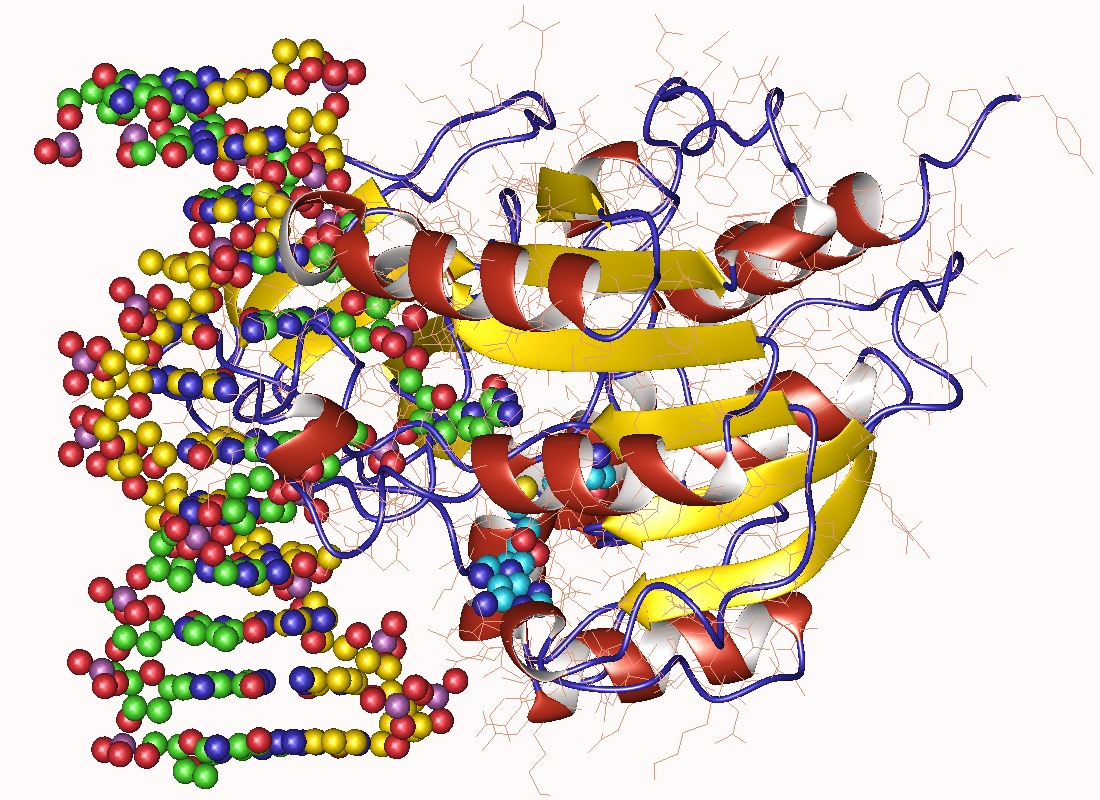
- HhaI methyltransferase monomer + DNA fragment, Haemophilus haemolyticus

Identifiers
- EC no.: 2.1.1.7
- CAS no.: 9029-79-2

Databases
- IntEnz: IntEnz view
- BRENDA: BRENDA entry
- ExPASy: NiceZyme view
- KEGG: KEGG entry
- MetaCyc: metabolic pathway
- PRIAM: profile
- PDB structures: RCSB PDB PDBe PDBsum
- Gene Ontology: AmiGO / QuickGO
Search
- PMC: articles
- PubMed: articles
- NCBI: proteins

Nicotinate N-methyltransferase (EC 2.1.1.7) is an enzyme that catalyzes the chemical reaction

nicotinic acid
+ SAM
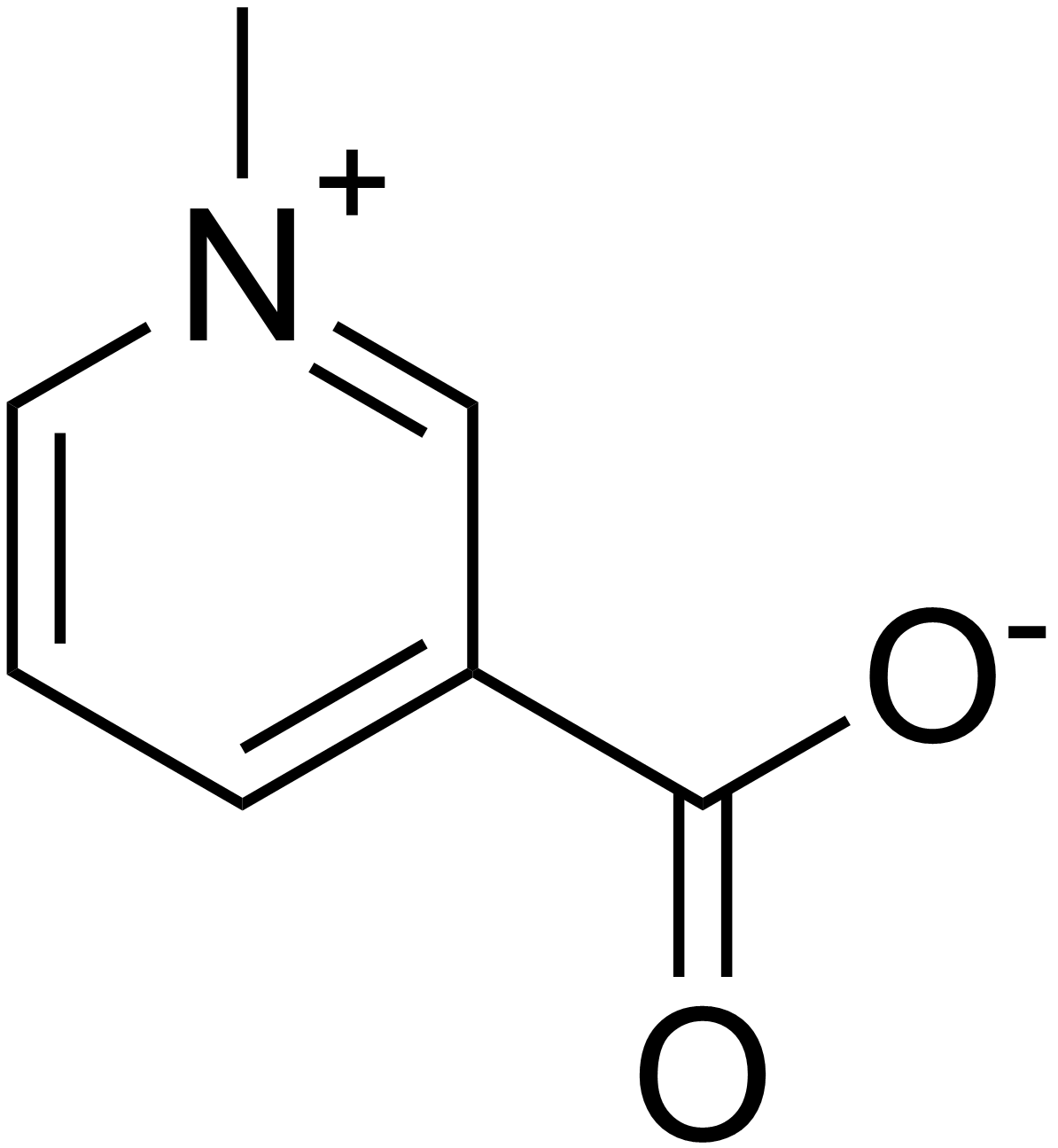
trigonelline
+ SAH

The enzyme catalyses a methylation reaction in which nicotinic acid is converted to trigonelline (N-methylnicotinate). The methyl group comes from the cofactor, S-adenosyl methionine (SAM), which loses its methyl group and becomes S-adenosyl-L-homocysteine (SAH).

This enzyme belongs to the family of transferases, specifically those transferring one-carbon group methyltransferases. The systematic name of this enzyme class is S-adenosyl-L-methionine:nicotinate N-methyltransferase. Other names in common use include furanocoumarin 8-methyltransferase, and furanocoumarin 8-O-methyltransferase. This enzyme participates in nicotinate and nicotinamide metabolism.

== Structural studies ==
As of late 2007, only one structure has been solved for this class of enzymes, with the PDB accession code 5MHT.
