= Kahweol =

Names
- IUPAC name (3bS,5aS,7R,8R,10aR,10bS)-3b,4,5,6,7,8,9,10,10a,10b-Decahydro-7-hydroxy-10b-methyl-5a,8-Methano-5aH-cyclohepta(5,6)naphtho(2,1-b)furan-7-methanol

Identifiers
CAS Number	6894-43-5
3D model (JSmol)	Interactive image
ChEBI	CHEBI:138308
ChemSpider	102755
PubChem CID	114778
UNII	KX95B6688Y
CompTox Dashboard (EPA)	DTXSID50988667
- InChI: InChI=1S/C20H26O3/c1–18–7–5–16–14(6–9–23–16)15(18)4–8–19–10–13(2–3–17(18)19)20(22,11–19)12–21/h5–7,9,13,15,17,21–22H,2–4,8,10–12H2,1H3/t13–,15–,17+,18–,19+,20+/m1/s1 Key: JEKMKNDURXDJAD-HWUKTEKMSA-N; InChI=1/C20H26O3/c1–18–7–5–16–14(6–9–23–16)15(18)4–8–19–10–13(2–3–17(18)19)20(22,11–19)12–21/h5–7,9,13,15,17,21–22H,2–4,8,10–12H2,1H3/t13–,15–,17+,18–,19+,20+/m1/s1 Key: JEKMKNDURXDJAD-HWUKTEKMBU
- SMILES: OC[C@@]5(O)C[C@@]43[C@H]([C@@]2(/C=C\c1occc1[C@H]2CC3)C)CC[C@@H]5C4

Properties
Chemical formula	C_{20}H_{26}O_{3}
Molar mass	314.425 g·mol^{−1}
Appearance	Colourless
Melting point	143–143.5 °C
- Except where otherwise noted, data are given for materials in their standard state (at 25 °C [77 °F], 100 kPa). verify (what is ?) Infobox references

Kahweol is a diterpenoid molecule found in the beans of Coffea arabica and is structurally related to cafestol. It was named after the Arabic قهوة qahwa meaning "coffee".

Kahweol belongs to a group of organic compounds known as naphthofurans, containing both naphthalene and furan moieties. It is a colourless crystal at room temperature that oxidises readily and yellows within hours.

== History ==
Kahweol was first isolated and identified as a constituent of coffee bean oil in 1932. The compound was isolated as its free "unsaponifiable" alcohol form. The solvent used greatly influences the crystal form, with acetone producing "large colorless trigonal or pentagonal dense plates," methanol producing "massive colorless quadratic plates," and ether producing "very long, snow-white silky needles."

While the presence of esters of cafestol (a hydrogenated analogue of kahweol) were apparent since the 1960s, it was not until 1982 that kahweol was isolated as an ester of its own. Following the development of liquid chromatography-mass spectrometry in the late 20th century, kahweol was isolated in other esteric forms, namely stearate, linoleate, and oleate, with minor amounts of arachidate and behenate.

== Role in plants ==
Kahweol, and its related diterpenoid cafestol, are found in all parts of the coffee plant. Transferred from the endosperm to the seedling during germination, it may have a role in defense against insects and pathogenic fungi.

== See also ==
- Cafestol
- Health effects of coffee
- List of chemical compounds in coffee
