= Green coffee extract =

Extract of unroasted coffee beans

Green coffee extract is an extract of unroasted, green coffee beans. It is used in the Swiss water process for decaffeinating coffee. It has also been used as a weight-loss supplement and as an ingredient in other weight-loss products, although there is insufficient clinical evidence that it is effective or safe for such uses. In 2014, one of the primary trials showing benefit was retracted and the company that sponsored the study, Applied Food Sciences, was fined by the Federal Trade Commission for making baseless weight-loss claims using the flawed study. Green coffee extract can also be prepared as an infusion from green coffee beans.

== Research ==
A 2011 review found tentative evidence that green coffee extract promotes weight loss; however, the quality of the evidence was poor. A larger 2017 review assessed the effects of chlorogenic acid, the main phenolic compound in green coffee extract, determining that human studies to date were of poor quality and that no conclusions could be drawn from them.

== History ==
In April and September 2012, The Dr. Oz Show featured green coffee extract, and conducted its own non-scientific study as to its efficacy. The guest on that show, Lindsey Duncan, had been fined $9 million by the Federal Trade Commission for making deceptive and unsubstantiated claims related to green coffee products promoted on The Dr. Oz Show.

== Controversy ==
Fortune magazine reported in June 2014 that the benefits of consuming green coffee bean extract had been largely disproved by studies to date, and that green coffee extract has been the subject of Federal Trade Commission action against a Florida company and the subject of Senate hearings against misleading advertising for weight loss products.

In May 2014, the Federal Trade Commission (FTC) charged the Florida-based manufacturers of a product called Pure Green Coffee with deceiving consumers with false weight loss claims. The FTC said that reliance on the Vinson study was deceptive since serious methodological flaws render its results unreliable.

On June 17, 2014, the U.S. Senate subcommittee on Science, and Transportation Committee held hearings to discuss weight-loss products and consumer protection. During the hearings, green coffee extract was cited often as an example of a "phony" product sold to consumers. When Dr. Oz. defended his endorsement of green coffee extract and other weight loss products on his show, Senator Claire McCaskill stated that the "scientific community is almost monolithic against you in terms of the efficacy of the three products that you call miracles." During the hearing, Dr. Oz stated "I actually do personally believe in the items I talk about on the show. I passionately study them. I recognize they don't have the scientific muster to present as fact but nevertheless I would give my audience the advice I give my family all the time, and I have given my family these products. Specifically the ones you mentioned, then I'm comfortable with that part." He said he believes in them "as short-term crutches, and even has his family try them. But there's no long-term miracle pill out there without diet and exercise."
