= Health effects of tea =

Influence of tea consumption on health

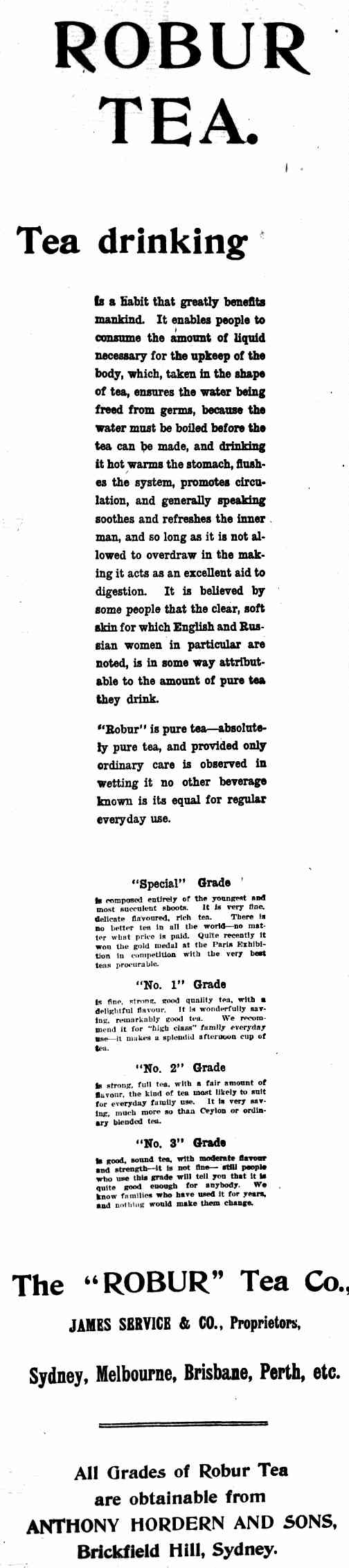
1912 advertisement for tea in the Sydney Morning Herald, describing its supposed health benefits

In clinical research conducted during the early 21st century, the health effects of tea have been widely studied.

Black tea is considered likely effective for improving alertness and possibly effective for certain conditions such as low blood pressure, but evidence does not support its effectiveness for preventing several types of cancer or diabetes; there is currently limited high-quality scientific evidence supporting most specific therapeutic uses of black tea. The United States Food and Drug Administration has approved a topical ointment formulated with a specific green tea extract for the treatment of external genital and perianal warts; although green tea and its extracts have been widely studied, the evidence remains inconclusive overall, with only modest or inconsistent benefits observed.

Two reviews of randomized controlled trials concluded that long-term consumption of black tea slightly lowers systolic and diastolic blood pressures (about 1–2 mmHg), a finding based on limited evidence. A 2013 Cochrane review found some evidence of benefit from tea consumption on cardiovascular markers (total and LDL cholesterol).

In regions without access to safe drinking water, boiling water is effective for reducing waterborne diseases by destroying pathogenic microorganisms, and this water can be used to make tea.

== By constituents or substances ==
=== Aluminium, iron and other metals ===
Tea drinking accounts for a high proportion of aluminium in the human diet. The levels are safe, but there has been some concern that aluminium traces may be associated with Alzheimer's disease. A 2013 study additionally indicated that some teas contained lead (mostly Chinese) and aluminum (Indian/Sri Lanka blends, China). There is still insufficient evidence to draw firm conclusions on this subject.

Most studies have found no association between tea intake and iron absorption. However, drinking excessive amounts of black tea may inhibit the absorption of iron, and may harm people with anaemia.

Concerns have been raised about the traditional method of over-boiling tea to produce a decoction, which may increase the amount of environmental contaminants released and consumed.

=== Fluoride exposure ===
All tea leaves contain fluoride; however, mature leaves contain as much as 10 to 20 times the fluoride levels of young leaves from the same plant.

The fluoride content of a tea leaf depends on the leaf picking method used and the fluoride content of the soil from which it has been grown; tea plants absorb this element at a greater rate than other plants. Care in the choice of the location where the plant is grown may reduce the risk. It is speculated that hand-picked tea would contain less fluoride than machine-harvested tea, because there is a much lower chance of harvesting older leaves during the harvest process. A 2013 British study of 38 teas found that cheaper UK supermarket tea blends had the highest levels of fluoride with about 580 mg per kilogram, green teas averaged about 397 mg per kg and pure blends about 132 mg per kg. The researchers suggested that economy teas may use older leaves which contain more fluoride. They calculated a person drinking a litre of economy tea per day would consume about 6 mg of fluoride, above the recommended average dietary intake level of 3–4 mg of fluoride per day, but below the maximum tolerable amount of 10 mg of fluoride per day. Brick tea, made from fallen leaves, old leaves and stems has the highest levels.

One study indicated that green tea leaves have an average fluoride concentration of 52 mg/kg, and approximately 89% of the fluoride was released from the leaves into tea after brewing.

=== Oxalates ===
Tea contains oxalate, overconsumption of which can cause kidney stones, as well as binding with free calcium in the body. The bioavailability of oxalate from tea is low, thus a possible negative effect requires a large intake of tea. Massive black tea consumption has been linked to kidney failure due to its high oxalate content (acute oxalate nephropathy).

=== Theanine and caffeine ===
Tea also contains theanine and the stimulant caffeine at about 3% of its dry weight, translating to between 30 mg and 90 mg per 8 US fluid ounces (240 mL) depending on type, brand and brewing method. Tea also contains small amounts of theobromine and theophylline. Dry tea has more caffeine by weight than dry coffee; nevertheless, more dry coffee than dry tea is used in typical drink preparations, which results in a cup of brewed tea containing significantly less caffeine than a cup of coffee of the same size.

The caffeine in tea is a mild diuretic. However, the British Dietetic Association has suggested that tea can be used to supplement normal water consumption, and that "the style of tea and coffee and the amounts we drink in the UK are unlikely to have a negative effect [on hydration]".

== By conditions ==
=== Cognitive effects ===
Drinking caffeinated tea may improve mental alertness due to the effects of caffeine.

=== Cancer ===
In 2011, the US Food and Drug Administration reported that there was little evidence to support the claim that green tea consumption may reduce the risk of breast and prostate cancer.

A 2010 report by the US National Cancer Institute stated that epidemiological studies and the few clinical trials of tea for the prevention of cancer were inconclusive. The institute "does not recommend for or against the use of tea to reduce the risk of any type of cancer." ... "Inconsistencies in study findings regarding tea and cancer risk may be due to variability in tea preparation, tea consumption, the bioavailability of tea compounds (the amounts that can be absorbed by the body), lifestyle differences, and individual genetic differences." Though there is some positive evidence for risk reduction of breast, prostate, ovarian, and endometrial cancers with green tea, it is weak and inconclusive.

Meta-analyses of observational studies have concluded that black tea consumption does not appear to protect against the development of oral cancers in Asian or Caucasian populations, the development of esophageal cancer or prostate cancer in Asian populations, or the development of lung cancer. In 2018, a meta-analysis based on 14 case-control studies found that tea consumption appears protective of oral cancer with a greater decrease in risk occurring with a larger intake (except for black tea and American people).

The consumption of very hot tea could increase the risk of esophageal cancer.

=== Cardiovascular disease ===
In preliminary long-term clinical studies, black tea consumption showed evidence for providing a small reduction in the risk of stroke, whereas, in another review, green tea and black tea did not have significant effects on the risk of coronary heart disease. Two reviews of randomized controlled trials concluded that long-term consumption of black tea slightly lowers systolic and diastolic blood pressures (about 1–2 mmHg), a finding based on limited evidence. A 2013 Cochrane review found some evidence of benefit from tea consumption on cardiovascular markers (total and LDL cholesterol), though more research is needed.

=== Fracture risk ===
Tea consumption does not appear to affect the risk of bone fracture including hip fractures or fractures of the humerus in men or women.

=== Weight loss ===
Although green tea is commonly believed to be a weight loss aid, there is no good evidence that its long-term consumption has any meaningful benefit in helping overweight or obese people to lose weight, or that it helps to maintain a healthy body weight. Use of green tea for attempted weight loss carries a small risk of adverse effects, such as nausea, constipation, and stomach discomfort.

== See also ==
- Health effects of coffee
- Phenolic content in tea
- Release of microplastics by tea bags
