= Utah Medical Cannabis Act initiative =

Proposition 2
- November 6, 2018
- Utah Medical Cannabis Act

Results
Choice	Votes	%
Yes	562,072	52.75%
No	503,558	47.25%
Total votes	1,065,630	100.00%
Yes
70%–80%
60%–70%
50%–60%
No
60%–70%
50%–60%

2018 Utah Proposition 2, also known as the Utah Medical Cannabis Act, is an initiative to legalize medical cannabis that qualified to appear on the November 2018 ballot in the state of Utah. The proposition passed.

== Background ==
A group called Utah Patients Coalition filed the Utah Medical Cannabis Act initiative in June, 2017. By the beginning of the year, the group had gathered more than half of the 113,000 signatures required to get an initiative for medical cannabis on the November ballot. The initiative allows for topicals, cannabis oil, cannabis edibles and vaping, but not smoking. Polls in the second half of 2017 showed up to 78% support for the initiative.

On March 26, the lieutenant governor's office validated 117,000 signatures on the Utah Medical Cannabis Act initiative, enough for it to get on the November ballot. On May 29, the Lieutenant Governor announced that over 153,000 signatures had been validated, and the initiative would still be appearing on the November ballot, despite a contentious effort by initiative opponents to have some names removed.

== Endorsements ==
Yes

Organizations

- Marijuana Policy Project
No

Statewide officials

- Gary Herbert, governor of Utah (2009–2021)

Organizations

- The Church of Jesus Christ of Latter-day Saints
