= Macrophomic acid =

Names
- Preferred IUPAC name 4-Acetyl-3-methoxy-5-methylbenzoic acid
- Systematic IUPAC name 4-Ethanoyl-3-methoxy-5-methylbenzenecarboxylic acid

Identifiers
CAS Number	100507-74-2
3D model (JSmol)	Interactive image
Beilstein Reference	5743941
ChEBI	CHEBI:38227
ChemSpider	9064373
PubChem CID	10889109
UNII	FWJ3488EA5
CompTox Dashboard (EPA)	DTXSID601028487
- InChI: InChI=1S/C11H12O4/c1-6-4-8(11(13)14)5-9(15-3)10(6)7(2)12/h4-5H,1-3H3,(H,13,14) Key: GWSISRLRTQOQNE-UHFFFAOYSA-N; InChI=1/C11H12O4/c1-6-4-8(11(13)14)5-9(15-3)10(6)7(2)12/h4-5H,1-3H3,(H,13,14) Key: GWSISRLRTQOQNE-UHFFFAOYAK
- SMILES: CC1=CC(=CC(=C1C(=O)C)OC)C(=O)O

Properties
Chemical formula	C_{11}H_{12}O_{4}
Molar mass	208.21 g/mol
Boiling point	385.3±42.0 °C
- Except where otherwise noted, data are given for materials in their standard state (at 25 °C [77 °F], 100 kPa). verify (what is ?) Infobox references

Macrophomic acid is a fungal metabolite isolated from the fungus Macrophoma commelinae. The enzyme macrophomate synthase converts 5-acetyl-4-methoxy-6-methyl-2-pyrone to 4-acetyl-3-methoxy-5-methyl-benzoic acid (macrophomic acid) through an unusual intermolecular Diels-Alder reaction (Scheme 1). The pathway to formation of macrophomic acid suggests that the enzyme is a natural Diels-Alderase. Formation of this type of aromatic ring compound normally proceeds via the shikimate and polyketide pathways; however, the production of macrophomic acid by macrophomate synthase proceeds totally differently. Learning about the production of macrophomic acid by a possible natural Diels-Alderase enzyme is important in understanding enzyme catalytic mechanisms. This knowledge can then be applied to organic synthesis.

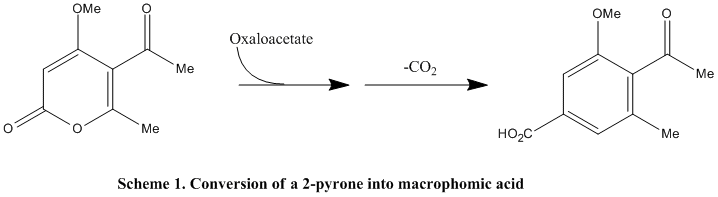

== Biosynthesis ==
The biosynthesis of macrophomic acid is catalyzed by the enzyme macrophomate synthase. The unusual multistep conversion of 5-acetyl-4-methoxy-6-methyl-2-pyrone (3) to macrophomic acid is thought to proceed by either a concerted Diels-Alder reaction or a recently proposed 2-step Michael-aldol sequence. The Michael-aldol sequence involves a Michael addition reaction and an aldol condensation. The actual pathway is not yet understood completely. In the conversion of the 2-pyrone (3), oxaloacetate (1) is decarboxylated to form an enolate that coordinates to a Mg^{2+} metal center (2) found in the active site of the enzyme. Then, the coordinated enolate can either add to the 2-pyrone (3) through a Michael-aldol or Diels-Alder pathway. Both pathways include a bicyclic intermediate (4).

In the Michael-aldol pathway (Scheme 2), The coordinated oxaloacetate enolate performs a Michael addition to the ring of the pyrone to form intermediate 4. Next, this intermediate undergoes an aldol condensation to form the proposed bicyclic intermediate (5). Finally, this bicyclic compound undergoes a decarboxylation to form intermediate 6 and dehydration to form macrophomic acid (7).

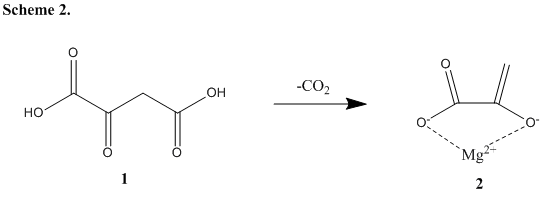

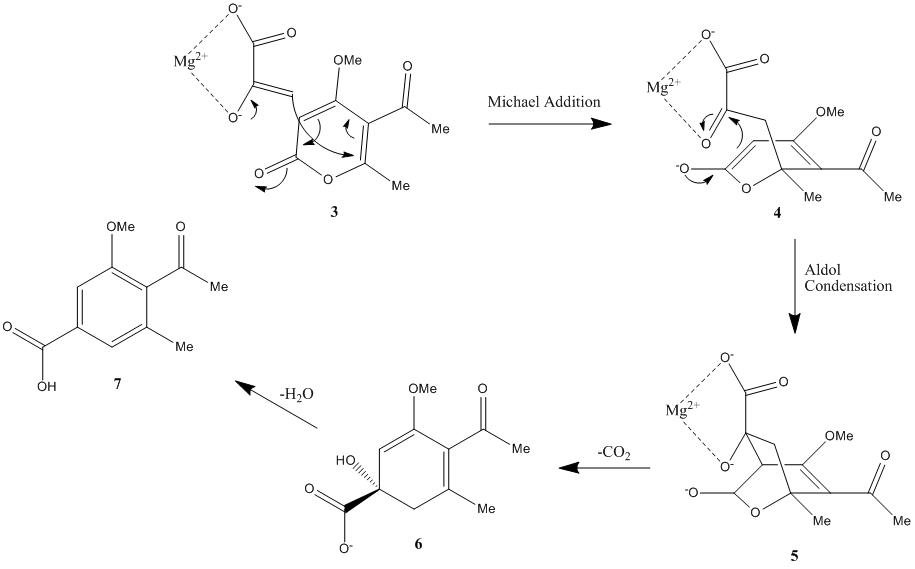

In the Diels-Alder mechanism for the biosynthesis of macrophomic acid (Scheme 3), oxaloacetate is decarboxylated to form the enolate complex with Mg^{2+}. Next, the enolate complex adds to the pyrone through a Diels-Alder concerted reaction to form a bicyclic intermediate (8). Then, just as in the Michael-aldol sequence, the bicyclic intermediate gets decarboxylated and dehydrated to form macrophomic acid (9). This pathway is thought to be the actual mechanism; however, according to QM/MM calculations, it seems that the Michael-aldol sequence is more energetically favored. There has also been difficulty in isolating the key intermediates for either proposed pathway.

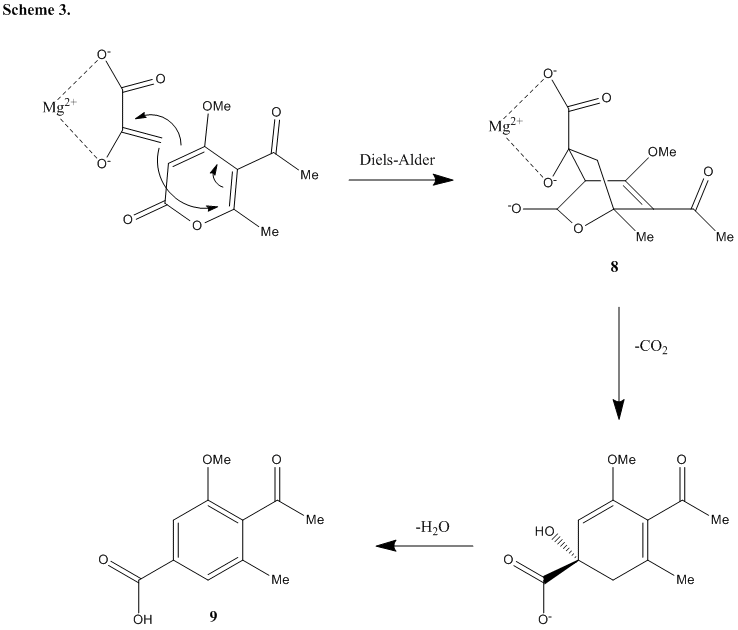
