= 3,4-Dimethoxycinnamic acid =

Names
- Preferred IUPAC name (2E)-3-(3,4-Dimethoxyphenyl)prop-2-enoic acid
- Other names 3-(3,4-Dimethoxyphenyl)propenoic acid; Caffeic acid dimethyl ether; Dimethyl caffeic acid; Dimethylcaffeic acid

Identifiers
| CAS Number | 14737-89-4; 2316-26-9 (nonspecific) |
| 3D model (JSmol) | Interactive image |
| ChemSpider | 626174 |
| ECHA InfoCard | 100.017.296 |
| PubChem CID | 717531 |
| UNII | BVZ841PVJL |
| CompTox Dashboard (EPA) | DTXSID10871869 |
- InChI: InChI=1S/C11H12O4/c1-14-9-5-3-8(4-6-11(12)13)7-10(9)15-2/h3-7H,1-2H3,(H,12,13)/b6-4+ Key: HJBWJAPEBGSQPR-GQCTYLIASA-N; InChI=1/C11H12O4/c1-14-9-5-3-8(4-6-11(12)13)7-10(9)15-2/h3-7H,1-2H3,(H,12,13)/b6-4+ Key: HJBWJAPEBGSQPR-GQCTYLIABS
- SMILES: COC1=C(C=C(C=C1)/C=C/C(=O)O)OC

Properties
| Chemical formula | C_{11}H_{12}O_{4} |
| Molar mass | 208.213 g·mol^{−1} |
- Except where otherwise noted, data are given for materials in their standard state (at 25 °C [77 °F], 100 kPa). Infobox references

3,4-Dimethoxycinnamic acid is a cinnamic acid derivative isolated from coffee beans.
