= Health effects of coffee =

Risks and possible benefits of drinking coffee

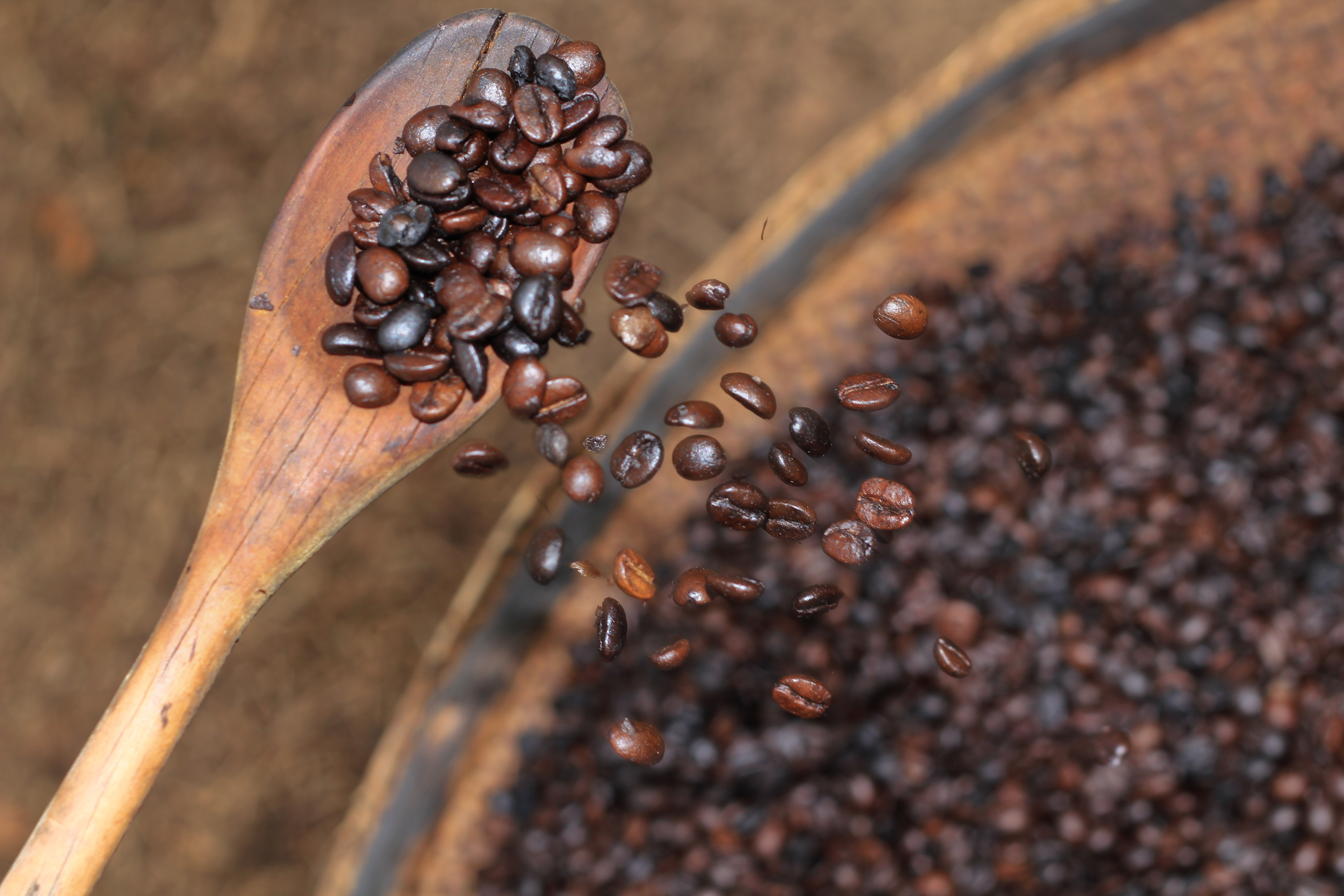
Coffee beans being scooped out of a container using a spatula

The health effects of coffee consumption are varied and include both potential benefits and health risks.

A 2017 umbrella review of meta-analyses found that the consumption of coffee is generally safe within usual levels of intake and is more likely to improve health outcomes than to cause harm at doses of 3 or 4 cups of coffee daily. Exceptions include possible increased risk in women having bone fractures, and a possible increased risk in fetal loss or decreased birth weight during pregnancy. Results were complicated by poor study quality, and differences in age, gender, health status, and serving size.

== Health effects ==
In 2026, the American Heart Association stated that drinking as many as five cups of caffeinated coffee per day (intake of about 400 mg of caffeine per day) over adult life was safe, and may benefit cardiovascular health in some people. The statement was based on a scientific review of human research indicating that regular coffee consumption may reduce the risk of type 2 diabetes, stroke, and other cardiovascular diseases, although considerable heterogeneity exists in the studies to date. Mechanisms for how habitual coffee consumption and caffeine intake in moderate amounts reduce cardiovascular disease risk are unknown.

A 2014 meta-analysis found that coffee consumption (4 cups/day) was inversely associated with all-cause mortality (a 16% lower risk), as well as cardiovascular disease mortality specifically (a 21% lower risk from drinking 3 cups/day), but not with cancer mortality.

Additional meta-analyses corroborated these findings, showing that higher coffee consumption (2–4 cups per day) was associated with a reduced risk of death by all disease causes.

=== Digestion ===
A 1999 review found that coffee does not cause indigestion, but may promote gastrointestinal reflux. Two reviews of clinical studies on people recovering from abdominal, colorectal, and gynecological surgery found that coffee consumption was safe and effective for enhancing postoperative gastrointestinal function.

In some people, coffee induces defecation within minutes of consumption. However, the specific mechanism of action and chemical constituents responsible are still unknown.

=== Cardiovascular disease ===
Moderate coffee consumption is not a risk factor for coronary heart disease.

A 2012 meta-analysis concluded that people who drank moderate amounts of coffee had a lower rate of heart failure, with the biggest effect found for those who drank more than four cups a day. A 2014 meta-analysis concluded that cardiovascular disease, such as coronary artery disease and stroke, is less likely with three to five cups of non-decaffeinated coffee per day but more likely with over five cups per day. A 2016 meta-analysis showed that coffee consumption was associated with a reduced risk of death in patients who have had a myocardial infarction. The effect of no or moderate daily consumption of coffee on risk for developing hypertension has been assessed in several reviews during the 21st century. A 2019 review found that one to two cups consumed per day did not affect hypertension risk, whereas drinking three or more cups per day reduced the risk. Another review in 2018 found that the risk of hypertension was reduced by 2% with each cup per day increment of coffee consumption up to 8 cups per day, compared with people who did not consume any coffee.

By contrast, a 2011 review found that drinking one to three cups of coffee per day may pose a slightly increased risk of developing hypertension.

The 2021 European Society of Cardiology Guidelines on Cardiovascular Disease Prevention in Clinical Practice state: "Non-filtered coffee contains LDL-C-raising cafestol and kahweol, and may be associated with an up to 25% increased risk of atherosclerosis (ASCVD) mortality by consumption of nine or more drinks a day. Non-filtered coffee includes boiled, Greek, and Turkish coffee and some espresso coffees. Moderate coffee consumption (3–4 cups per day) is probably not harmful, perhaps even moderately beneficial".

=== Parkinson's disease ===
Meta-analyses have consistently found that long-term coffee consumption is associated with a lower risk of Parkinson's disease.

=== Type II diabetes ===
In a systematic review and meta-analysis of 28 prospective observational studies, representing over one million participants, every additional cup of caffeinated and decaffeinated coffee consumed in a day was associated, respectively, with a 9% and 6% lower risk of type 2 diabetes.

=== Cancer ===
Meta-analyses on the effects of coffee consumption on cancer risk are inconclusive. The American Institute for Cancer Research and World Cancer Research Fund have stated that there is strong evidence that coffee consumption reduces the risk of endometrial cancer and liver cancer.

The World Health Organization's 2016 IARC Monograph "found no conclusive evidence for a carcinogenic effect of drinking coffee" but found that drinking very hot beverages probably causes cancer of the oesophagus.

=== Liver disease ===
According to The British Liver Trust, regular consumption of coffee may support liver health and reduce the risk of some liver diseases, a finding supported by a 2026 questionnaire based study, irrespective of caffeine content or use of sugar or artificial sweeteners.

=== Stroke ===
Meta-analyses have found that coffee consumption is associated with a decreased stroke risk at three to four cups a day.

== Mental health ==
=== Anxiety disorder ===
The UK National Health Service advises that avoiding coffee may reduce anxiety. In chronic psychiatric patients, caffeine, the major active ingredient in coffee, is associated with anxiety. At high doses, typically greater than 300 mg, caffeine can both cause and worsen anxiety. For some people, discontinuing caffeine use can significantly reduce anxiety. Caffeine-induced anxiety disorder is a subclass of substance- or medication-induced anxiety disorder. Populations that may be most impacted by caffeine consumption are adolescents and people with anxiety disorders.

=== Depression ===
Preliminary research indicated the possibility of a beneficial relationship between coffee intake and reduced depression.

=== Dementia ===
A systematic review of literature published before 2014, including assessment of symptoms for dementia and cognitive impairment, was inconclusive for coffee having an effect in the elderly, mainly due to the poor quality of the studies.

== See also ==
- Health effects of tea
- Low caffeine coffee
