= Trigonelline =

Names
- Preferred IUPAC name 1-Methylpyridin-1-ium-3-carboxylate
- Other names Nicotinic acid N-methylbetaine; Coffearine; Caffearine; Gynesine; N-methylnicotinate

Identifiers
CAS Number	535-83-1
3D model (JSmol)	Interactive image
ChEBI	CHEBI:18123
ChEMBL	ChEMBL350675; ChEMBL489961
ChemSpider	5369
ECHA InfoCard	100.007.838
KEGG	C01004
PubChem CID	5570
UNII	3NQ9N60I00
CompTox Dashboard (EPA)	DTXSID2026230
- InChI: InChI=1S/C7H7NO2/c1-8-4-2-3-6(5-8)7(9)10/h2-5H,1H3 Key: WWNNZCOKKKDOPX-UHFFFAOYSA-N; InChI=1/C7H7NO2/c1-8-4-2-3-6(5-8)7(9)10/h2-5H,1H3 Key: WWNNZCOKKKDOPX-UHFFFAOYAV
- SMILES: O=C([O-])c1ccc[n+](c1)C

Properties
Chemical formula	C_{7}H_{7}NO_{2}
Molar mass	137.138 g·mol^{−1}
Melting point	230 to 233 °C (446 to 451 °F; 503 to 506 K) (monohydrate); 258–259 °C (hydrochloride)
- Except where otherwise noted, data are given for materials in their standard state (at 25 °C [77 °F], 100 kPa). Infobox references

Trigonelline is an alkaloid with chemical formula C_{7}H_{7}NO_{2}. It is a zwitterionic betaine formed by the methylation of the nitrogen atom of niacin (vitamin B_{3}). Trigonelline is a product of niacin metabolism that is excreted in the urine of mammals.

Trigonelline occurs in many plants. It has been isolated from the Japanese radish (Raphanus sativus cv. Sakurajima Daikon), fenugreek seeds (Trigonella foenum-graecum, hence the name), garden peas, hemp seed, oats, potatoes, Stachys species, dahlia, Strophanthus species, and Dichapetalum cymosum. Trigonelline is also found in coffee. Higher levels of trigonelline are found in arabica coffee.

Holtz, Kutscher, and Theilmann have recorded its presence in a number of animals.

== Chemistry ==
Trigonelline crystallizes as a monohydrate from alcohol in hygroscopic prisms (m.p. 130 °C or 218 °C [dry, dec.]). It is readily soluble in water or warm alcohol, less so in cold alcohol, and slightly so in chloroform or ether. The salts crystallize well, the monohydrochloride, in leaflets, sparingly soluble in dry alcohol. The picrate forms shining prisms (m.p. 198−200 °C) soluble in water but sparingly soluble in dry alcohol or ether. The alkaloid forms several aurichlorides: the normal salt, B•HCl•AuCl_{3}, is precipitated when excess of gold chloride is added to the hydrochloride, and, after crystallization from dilute hydrochloric acid containing some gold chloride, has m.p. 198 °C. Crystallized from water or very dilute hydrochloric acid, slender needles of B_{4}•3 HAuCl_{4} (m.p. 186 °C) are obtained.

When trigonelline is heated in closed tubes with barium hydroxide at 120 °C, it gives rise to methylamine, and, if treated similarly with hydrochloric acid at 260 °C creates chloromethane and nicotinic acid (a form of vitamin B_{3}). Trigonelline is a methyl betaine of nicotinic acid.

== Biosynthesis ==
Nicotinate N-methyltransferase is the enzyme which converts nicotinic acid to trigonelline. The methyl group comes from the cofactor, S-adenosyl methionine (SAM), which becomes S-adenosyl-L-homocysteine (SAH).

nicotinic acid
+ SAM
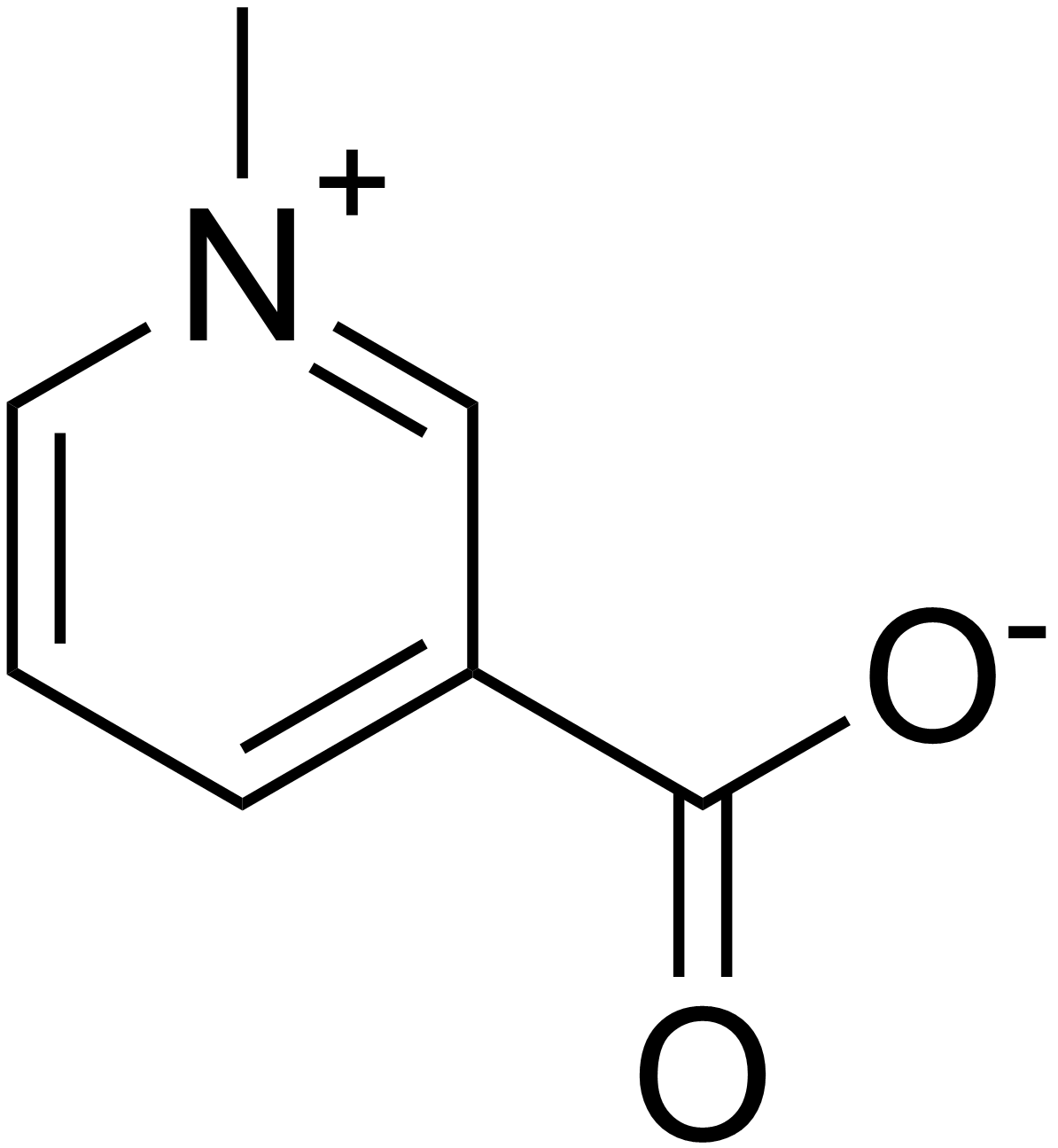
trigonelline
+ SAH
