= Peaberry =

Sole coffee bean in certain coffee fruits

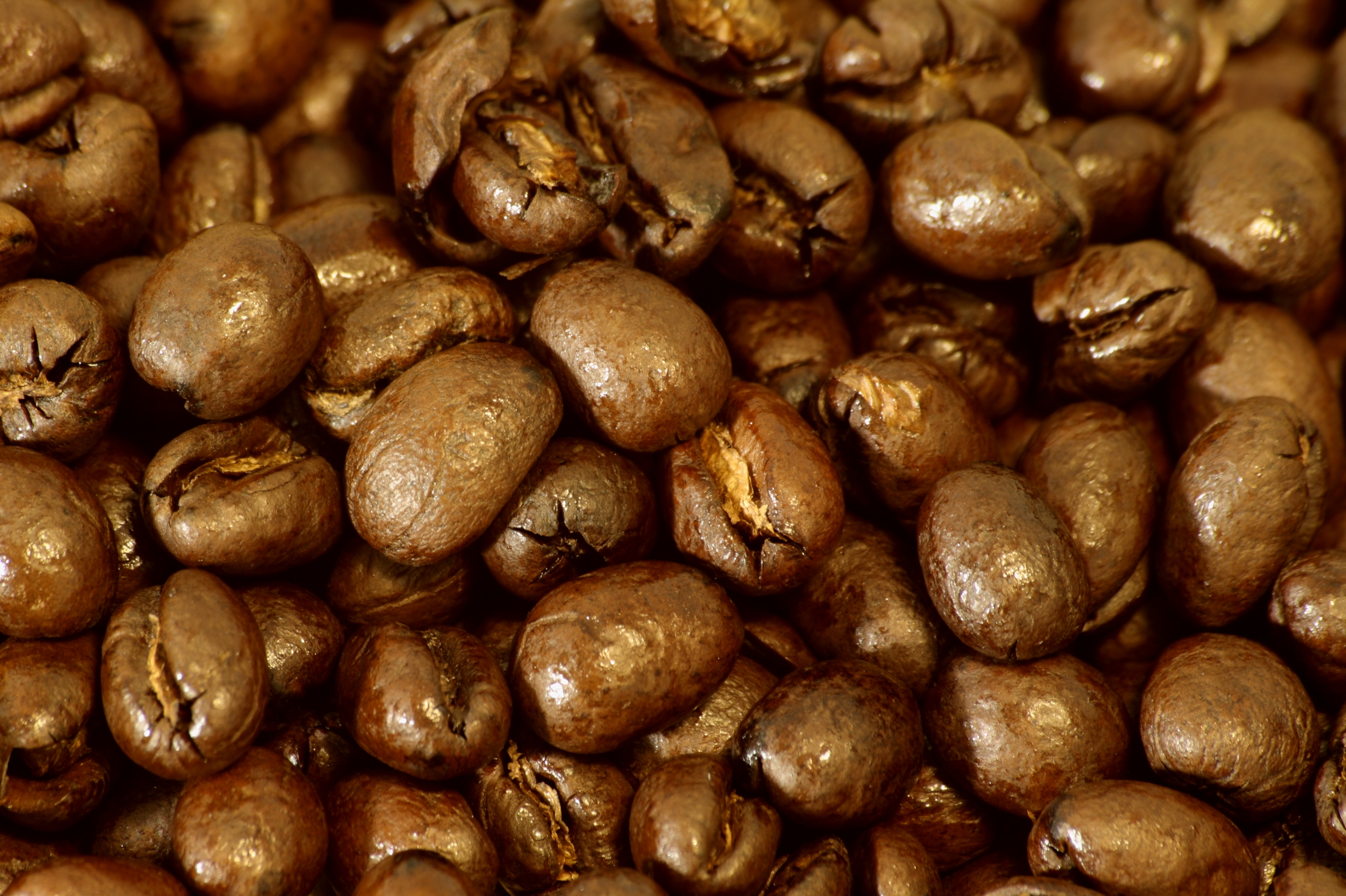
Roasted peaberry coffee beans

Peaberry, known in Spanish as caracolillo, is a type of coffee bean. Normally the fruit ("cherry") of the coffee plant contains two seeds ("beans") that develop with flattened facing sides, but sometimes only one of the two seeds is fertilized, and the single seed develops with nothing to flatten it. This oval (or pea-shaped) bean is known as peaberry. Typically around 5% of all coffee beans harvested are of this form.

Normal coffee beans are less commonly called by contrast flat bean.

Peaberry coffees are particularly associated with Tanzanian coffee, although the peaberry variety of Kona coffee has also become quite prominent.

== Roasting ==
Peaberry beans roast differently from the corresponding flat berry beans; hence, to ensure an even roast in high-grade coffee, peaberry beans are often separated.

Peaberry coffee tastes different from the coffee from normal beans from the same crop because the different bean shape leads to different roasting characteristics. The reference states that peaberry coffee is typically more brightly acidic, more complex in the upper aromatic ranges of the profile but somewhat lighter in body, than coffee made from normally shaped beans from the same batch. However, the claim that peaberry beans roast better and more evenly than flat beans because their rounder shape allows the berries to roll more easily has not been substantiated.
