= Cafestol =

Names
- IUPAC name 3,18-(Epoxymetheno)-19-nor-5β,8α,9β,10α,13β,16β-kaur-3-ene-16α,17-diol
- Systematic IUPAC name (3bS,5aS,7R,8R,10aR,10bS)-7-(Hydroxymethyl)-10b-methyl-3b,4,5,6,7,8,9,10,10a,10b,11,12-dodecahydro-5a,8-methanocyclohepta[5,6]naphtho[2,1-b]furan-7-ol

Identifiers
CAS Number	469-83-0
3D model (JSmol)	Interactive image
ChEBI	CHEBI:3291
ChemSpider	10289419
KEGG	C09066
PubChem CID	108052
UNII	AC465T6Q6W
CompTox Dashboard (EPA)	DTXSID3040986
- InChI: InChI=1/C20H28O3/c1-18-7-5-16-14(6-9-23-16)15(18)4-8-19-10-13(2-3-17(18)19)20(22,11-19)12-21/h6,9,13,15,17,21-22H,2-5,7-8,10-12H2,1H3/t13?,15-,17+,18-,19+,20+/m1/s1 Key: DNJVYWXIDISQRD-GTATUSGQBK
- SMILES: OC[C@@]5(O)C[C@@]31C[C@@H]5CC[C@H]1[C@]4(C)CCc2occc2[C@H]4CC3

Properties
Chemical formula	C_{20}H_{28}O_{3}
Molar mass	316.441 g·mol^{−1}
Melting point	158 to 162 °C (316 to 324 °F; 431 to 435 K)
- Except where otherwise noted, data are given for materials in their standard state (at 25 °C [77 °F], 100 kPa). Infobox references

Cafestol is a diterpenoid molecule present in coffee beans. It is one of the compounds that may be responsible for proposed biological and pharmacological effects of coffee.

== Sources ==
A typical bean of Coffea arabica contains about 0.4% to 0.7% cafestol by weight. Cafestol is present in highest quantity in unfiltered coffee drinks such as French press coffee, and Turkish coffee. In paper-filtered coffee drinks such as drip brewed coffee, it is present in only negligible amounts, as the paper filter in drip filtered coffee retains the diterpenes.

== Research into biological activity ==
Coffee consumption has been associated with a number of effects on health and cafestol has been proposed to produce these through a number of biological actions. Studies have shown that regular consumption of boiled coffee increases serum cholesterol whereas filtered coffee does not. Cafestol may act as an agonist ligand for the nuclear receptor farnesoid X receptor and pregnane X receptor, blocking cholesterol homeostasis. Thus cafestol can increase cholesterol synthesis.

Cafestol has also shown anticarcinogenic properties in rats.

Cafestol also has neuroprotective effects in a Drosophila fruit fly model of Parkinson's disease.

== See also ==
- Kahweol
- Health effects of coffee
- List of chemical compounds in coffee
