= Herbal tea =

Beverage made from infusing or decocting plant material in hot water

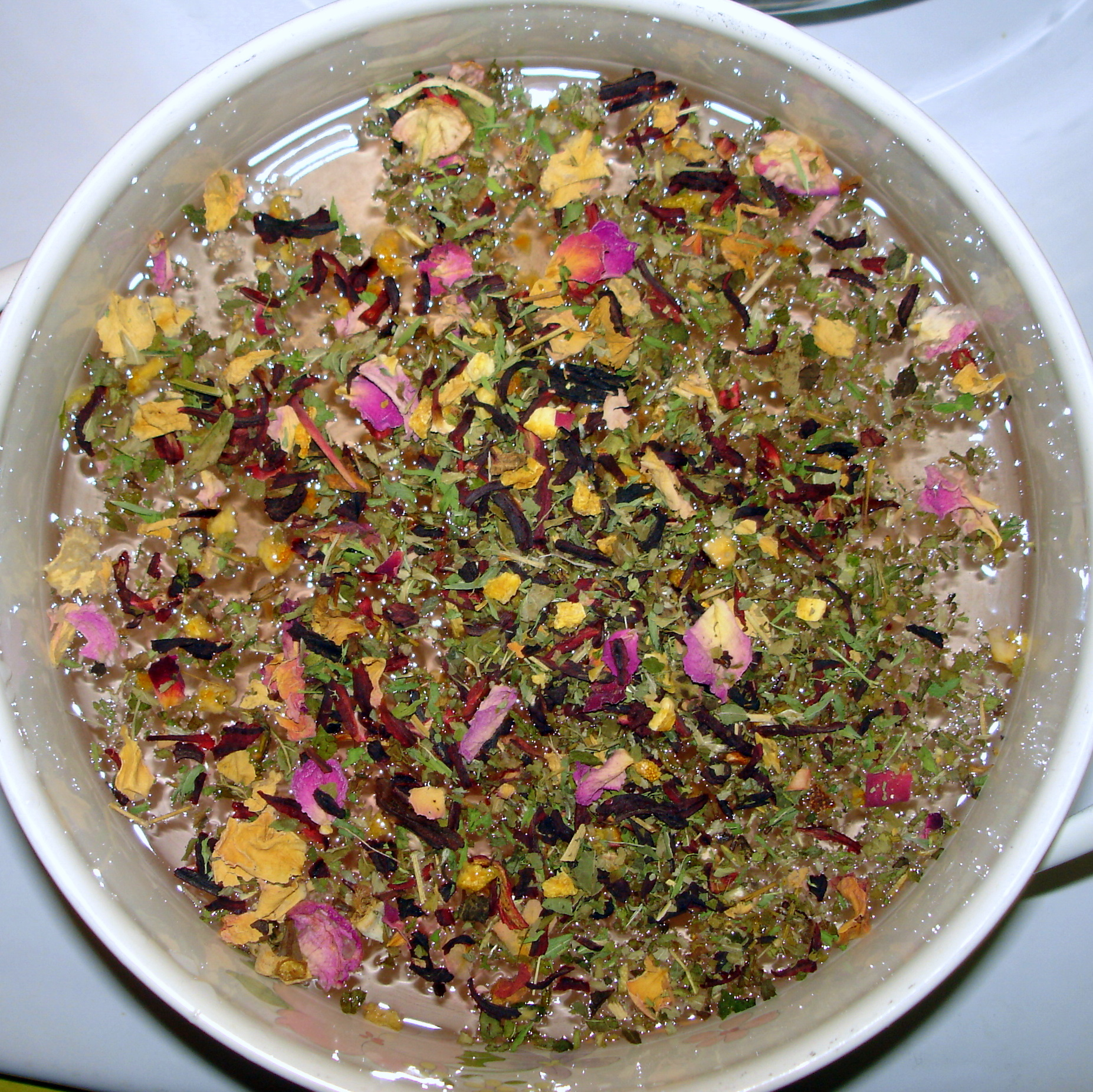
"Hibiscus Delight", made from hibiscus flowers, rose hips, orange peel, green tea, and red raspberry leaf, steeping

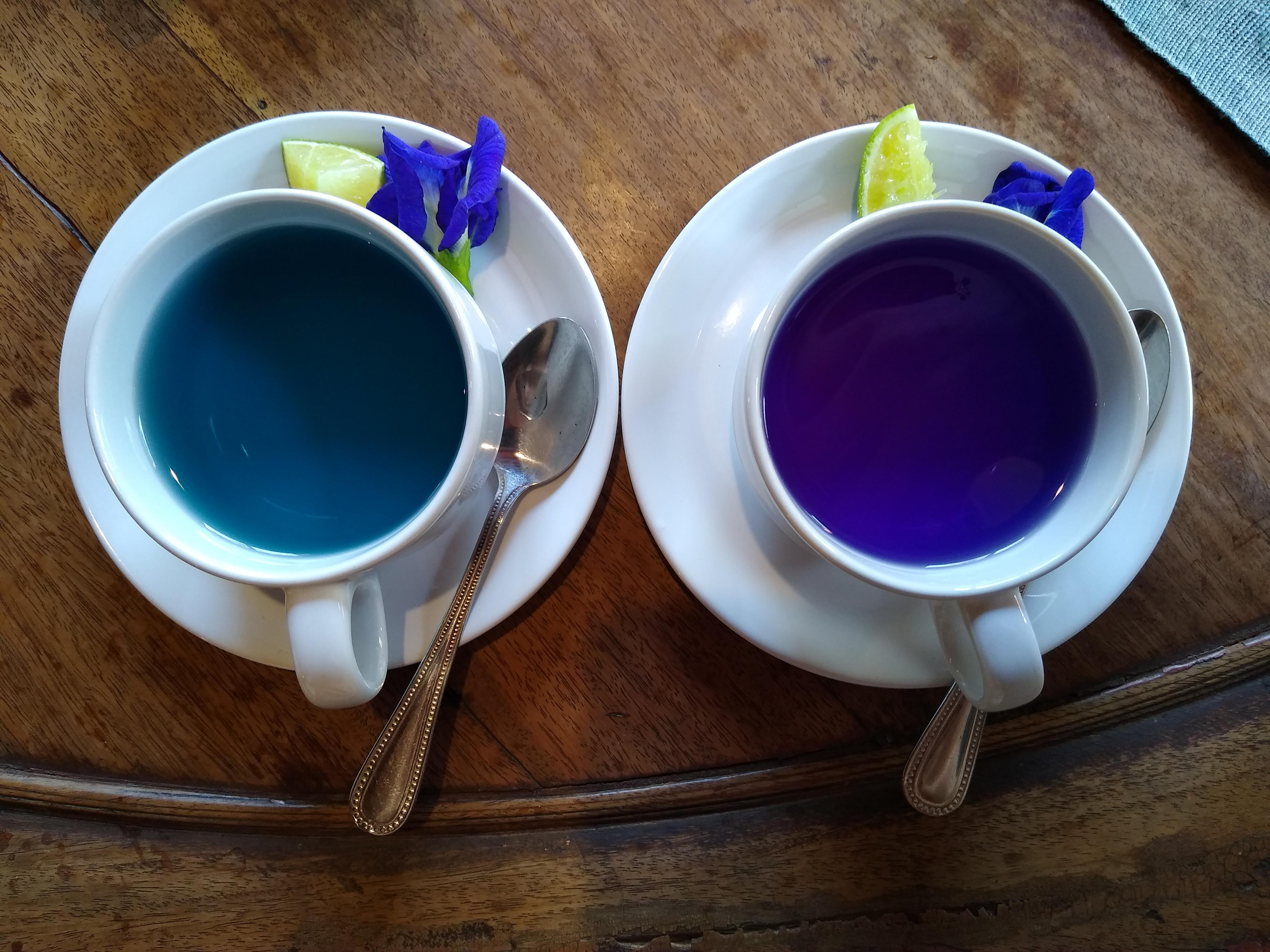
Butterfly-pea flower tea. The one on the right has had lime juice added, making it turn purple.

Herbal teas or herb teas, technically known as herbal infusions and less commonly called tisanes, are beverages made from the infusion or decoction in water of any herbs, spices, or other plant material (except tea leaves). Many herbs used in teas/tisanes are also used in herbal medicine and in folk medicine.

Herbal teas are not technically a tea because they are not brewed from the tea plant (Camellia sinensis). The term "herbal tea" is often used to distinguish these infusions from true teas (e.g., black, green, white, yellow, oolong). Blended teas include material from other plants, such as in jasmine tea, genmaicha, and Earl Grey tea.

Unlike true teas, most tisanes do not naturally contain caffeine (though tea can be decaffeinated, i.e., processed to remove caffeine). A number of plants, however, do contain psychoactive compounds, such as caffeine or another stimulant, like theobromine, cocaine or ephedrine. Some have the opposite effect, acting as a sedative. Some common infusions have specific names such as mate (yerba mate) and rooibos (red bush).

== Etymology ==
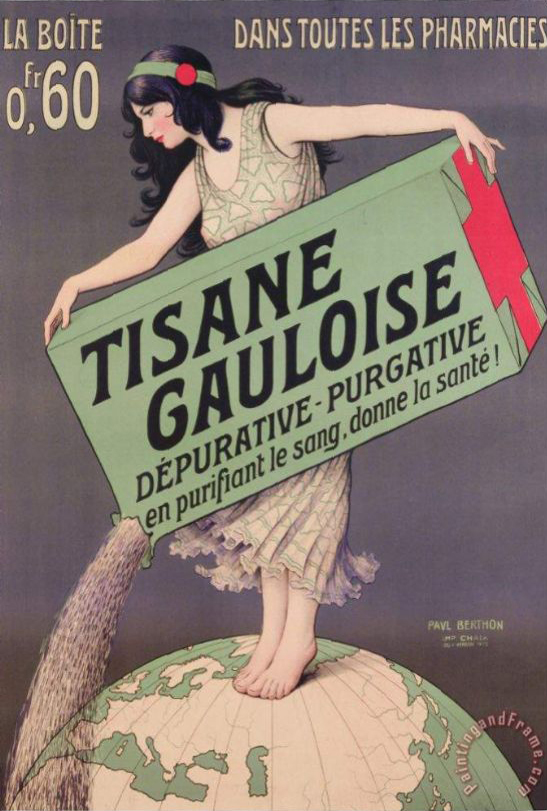
A promotional French poster for "Tisane Gauloise", by Paul Berthon

Dictionaries commonly record that the word tea is used to refer to other plants beside the tea plant and to beverages made from these other plants. The term herbal tea is well established and more common than tisane for this usage.

Furthermore, in the etymology of tea, the most ancient term for tea was 荼 (pronounced tu) which originally referred to various plants such as sow thistle, chicory, or smartweed, and was later used to exclusively refer to Camellia sinensis (true "tea").

The word tisane was rare in its modern sense before the 20th century, when it was borrowed in the modern sense from French. This is why some people feel it should be pronounced /tɪˈzɑːn/ as in French, but the original English pronunciation /tɪˈzæn/ continues to be more common in US English and especially in UK English.

The word had already existed in late Middle English in the sense of "medicinal drink" and had already been borrowed from French (Old French). The Old French word came from the Latin word ptisana, which came from the Ancient Greek word πτισάνη (ptisánē), which meant "peeled" barley, in other words pearl barley, and a drink made from this that is similar to modern barley water.

== Composition and usage ==
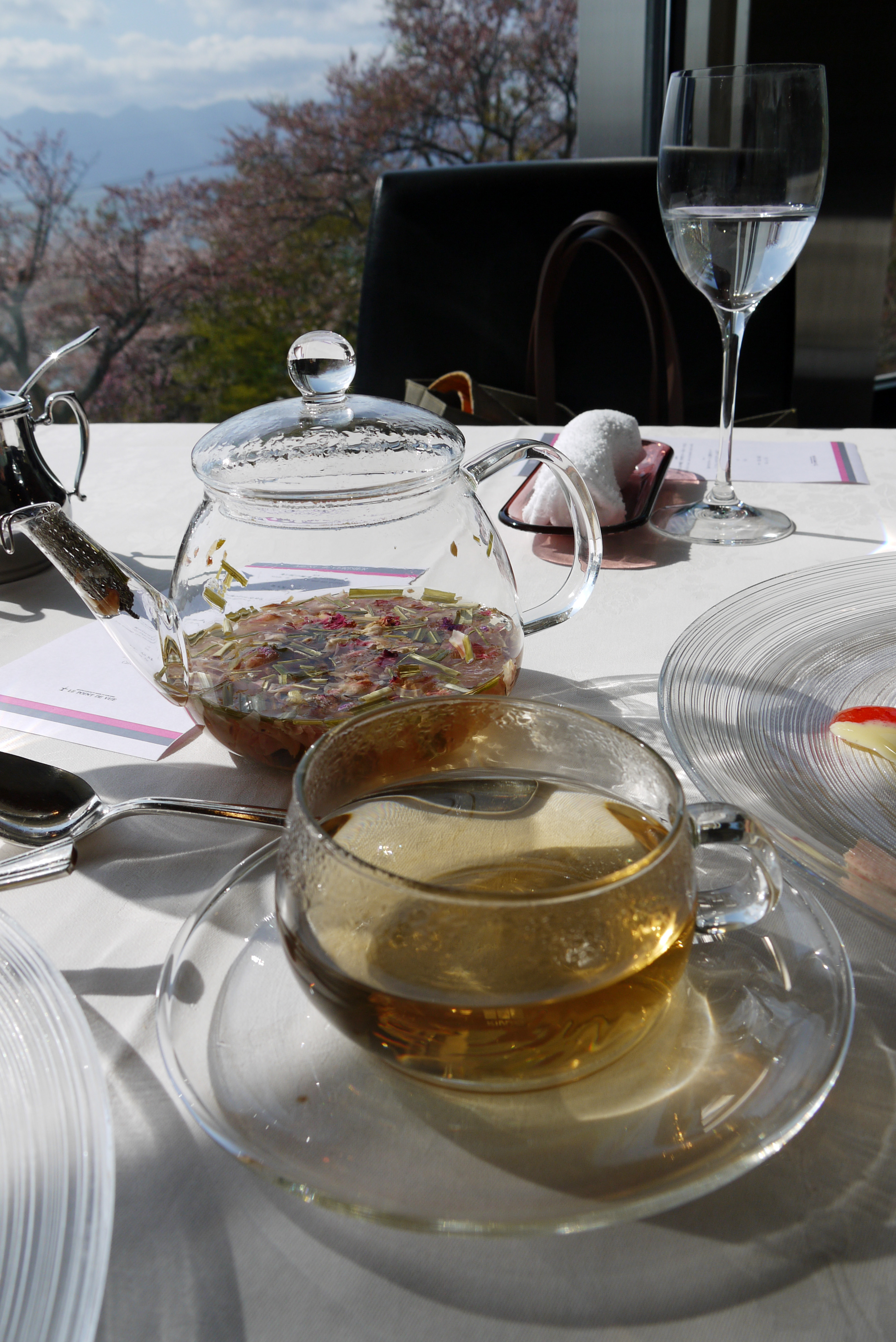
Herbal tea in a glass teapot and cup

Herbal teas can be made with any part of a plant, including fresh or dried flowers, fruit, leaves, stems, seeds, or roots. These parts may be steeped fully raw (as picked) or processed in some way (such as drying, roasting, crushing, tearing/cutting, steaming, etc.).

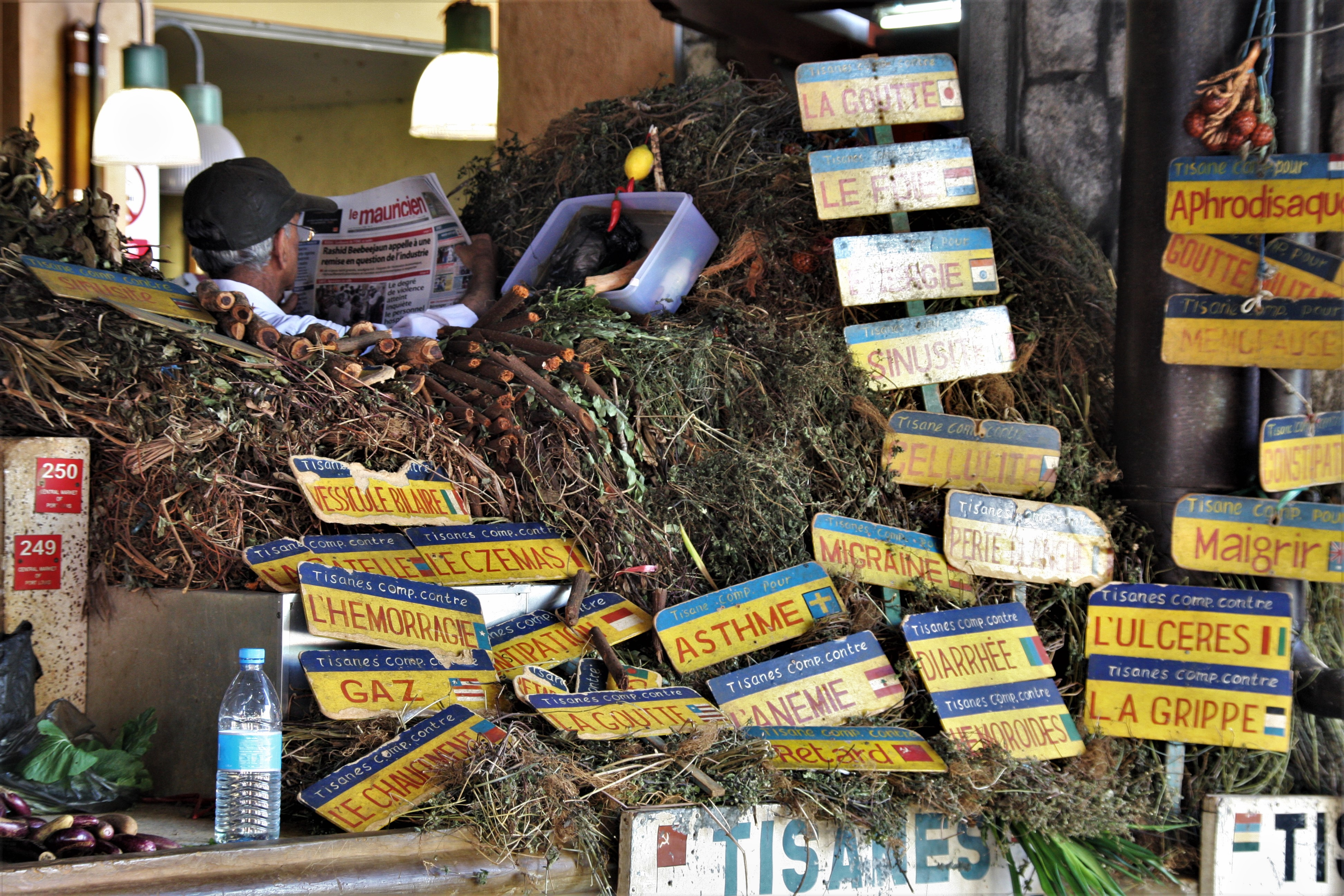
Herbal tisanes being sold in Mauritius as medicines for various diseases

Herbal infusions may be made by pouring hot or boiling water over the plant parts and letting them steep for some time. The infusion temperature and time can vary depending on the type of plant part used and its properties. For example, some plant parts are covered in oils, which may take some time to separate. Brewing with cold water will also take much longer, usually several hours.

An herbal tea may be strained or not (as with mate, where a special straw called a bombilla is used for drinking).

Some herbal teas are blends that include various herbs or plant parts. Herbal infusions may also be sweetened, spiced, salted, or combined with other additives, like milk or lemon juice.

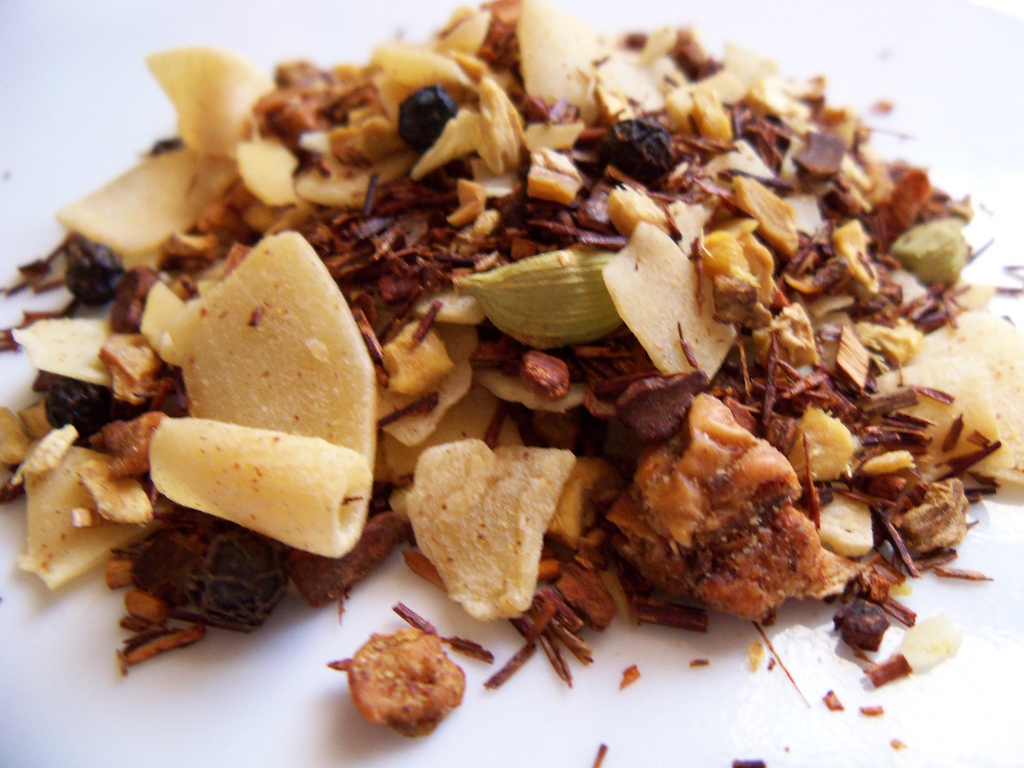
This retail mixture contains rooibos, coconut, ginger, cinnamon, apple, cardamom, black pepper, and almond.

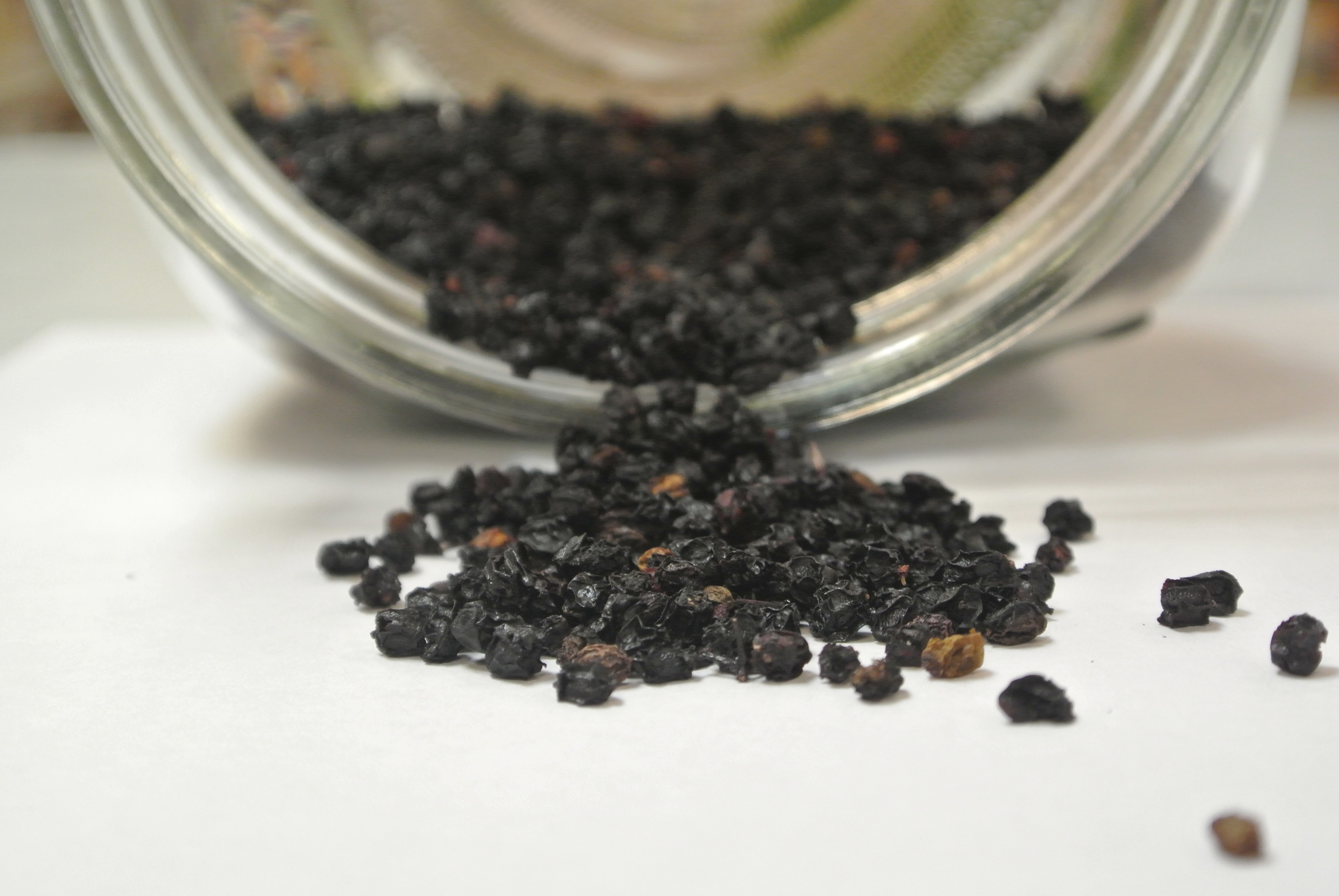
Dried elderberries ready to be steeped into tea

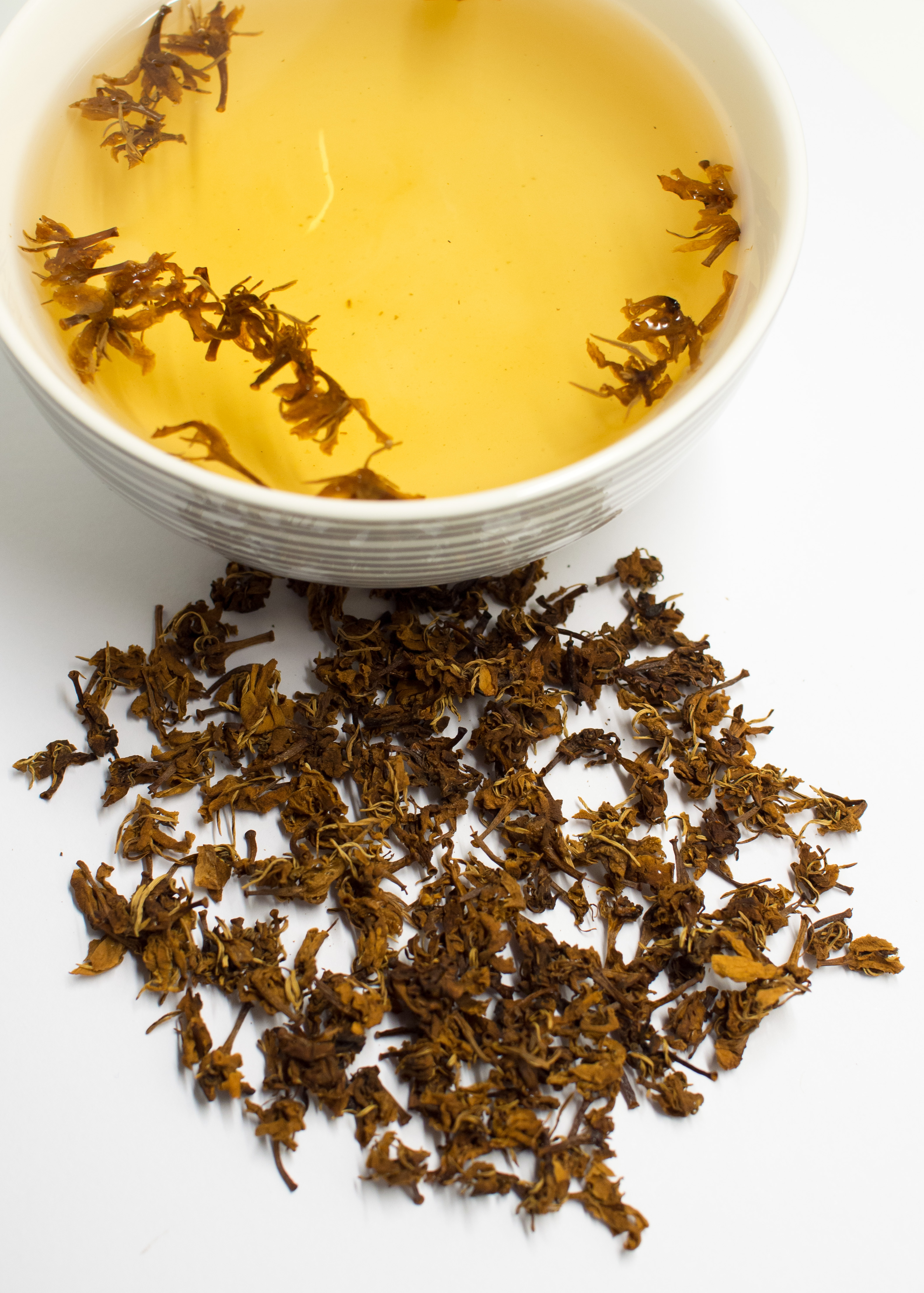
Coffee blossom tea

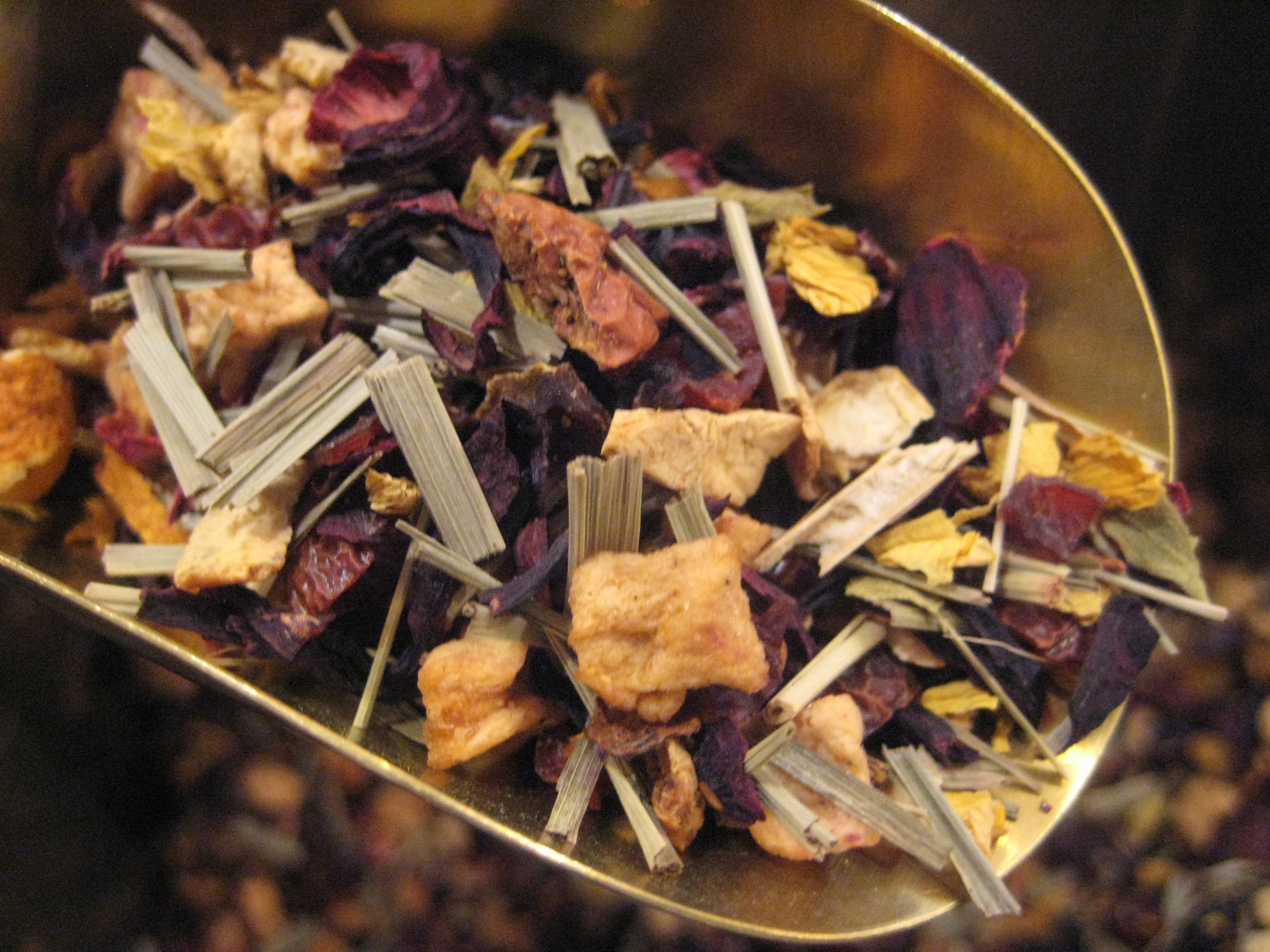
Apple, rose hips, orange zest, papaya, peppermint, liquorice root, lemon grass, cinnamon, blackcurrants, rose, and mallow blossoms

== Varieties ==
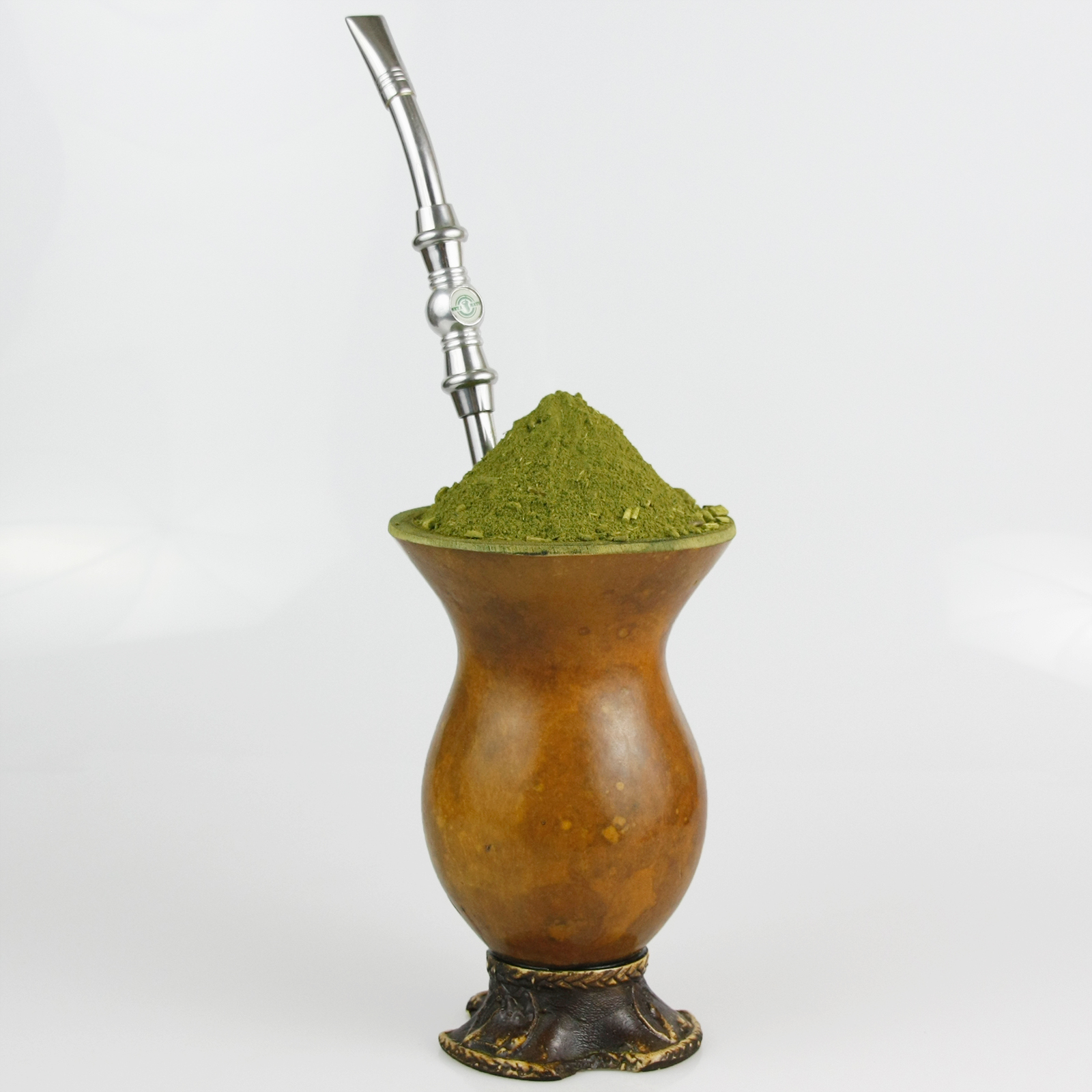
A yerba mate infusion, popular in South America

Herbal teas can be made from any edible plant material; below is a list of common herbal infusions. Some herbal teas are made from plants which contain caffeine, and other herbal infusions may contain other psychoactive compounds. However, many other common herbal teas have not been shown psychoactive properties when compared to placebos, though they may still have some physical effects.

Many herbal teas on the market may also be blends which include various herbs or plant parts. These blends may also include additives, like flavorings.

=== Caffeinated infusions ===
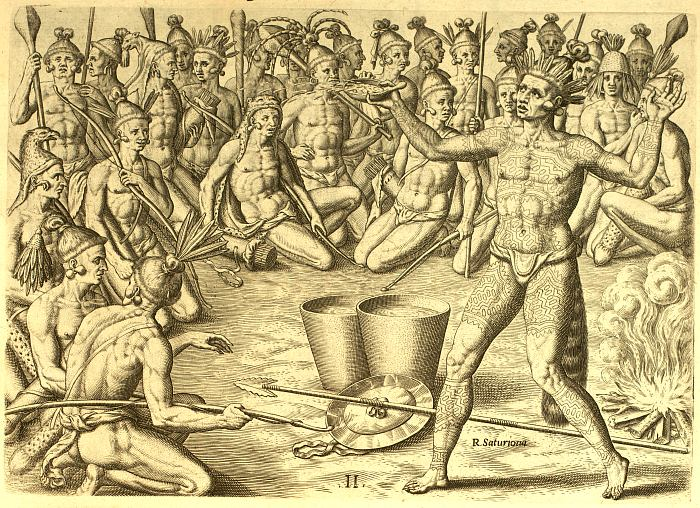
Saturiwa and his warriors drinking yaupon tea before battle, 16th century Florida, by Jacques le Moyne

- Bissy tea, a beverage made from kola nuts popular in Jamaica
- Cacao bean tea, which contains theobromine and a small amount of caffeine.
- Coffee-leaf tea, coffee fruit tea, and coffee blossom tea are herbal teas made using the leaves, fruits, and flowers of the coffee plant
- Guarana tea, a beverage made from guarana seeds containing more than three times the caffeine of coffee
- Guayusa tea, made from the caffeinated leaves of the Ilex guayusa holly, native to the Amazon rainforest
- Mate, a South American caffeinated tea made from the holly yerba mate (Ilex paraguariensis)
- Yaupon tea, made from caffeinated leaves of the yaupon holly (Ilex vomitoria) native to North America
- Tea made from Ilex cassine (dahoon holly or cassena), which has less caffeine than yaupon, but more theobromine

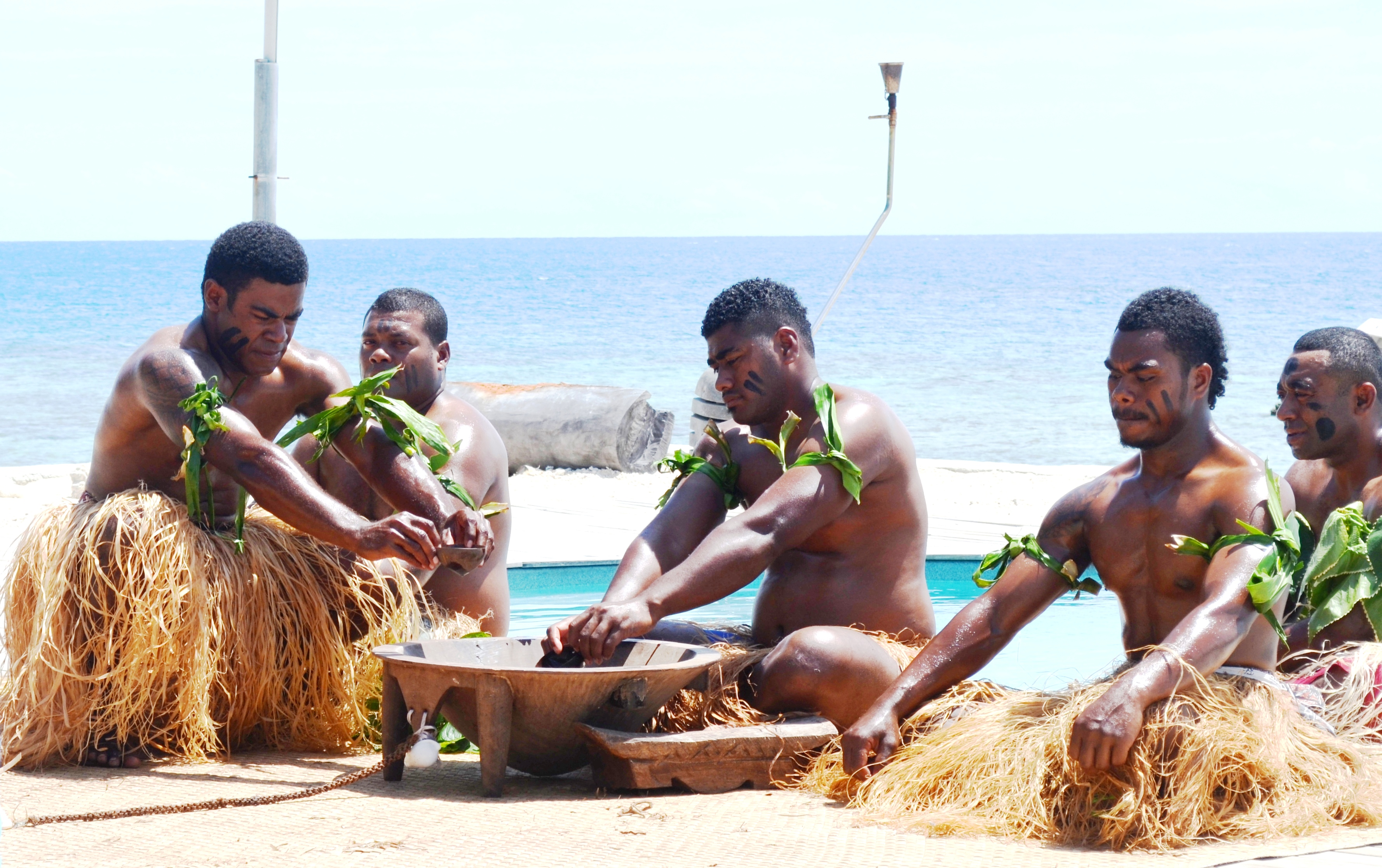
Fijian kava ceremony

=== Other psychoactive infusions ===
- Ayahuasca, a South American psychoactive decoction prepared from Banisteriopsis caapi vine and a dimethyltryptamine (DMT)-containing plant, which has different legal statuses depending on jurisdiction.
- Cannabis tea, which contains the psychoactive THC. It is a common drink in India, where it is known as bhang.
- Coca tea, infusion made from coca leaves. Contains trace amounts of cocaine and similar alkaloids. In some countries where coca is illegal, products marketed as "coca tea" are supposed to be decocainized, i.e., the pharmacologically active components have been removed from the leaf using the same chemicals as manufacturing cocaine.
- Kava root tea, common in Pacific island cultures (Polynesia, Melanesia, Micronesia), which has sedative effects and anesthetic effects caused by compounds called kavalactones. The traditional form is a water-based suspension of kava roots.
- Kratom tea made from the dried leaves of the kratom tree. It has opioid-like properties and some stimulant-like effects.
- St. John's wort tea; the plant has been shown to have antidepressant properties, according to a 2017 meta-analysis.
- Ephedra tea, mainly from the plant Ephedra sinica. It contains the stimulant ephedrine. It has been used in traditional Chinese medicine, where it is called máhuáng, for more than 2,000 years. Ephedra tea was also used by Native Americans and Mormons, hence the names "Mormon tea" and "Indian tea".
- Poppy tea, brewed from the poppy straw or seeds of several species of poppy (most commonly Papaver somniferum). Since it contains opium, it is consumed for its narcotic, sedative, and analgesic properties.
- Salvia divinorum ("Sage of the diviners") tea which contains salvinorin A, a compound that induces a dissociative state and hallucinations.
- African dream root (Silene undulata), which is an oneirogen used by the Xhosa people as a sacred plant.
- Tabernanthe iboga, which can be made into an infusion, is traditionally used by the peoples of Central Africa and in African traditional medicine as a stimulant (in low doses) or as a powerful ritual hallucinogen (in larger quantities).
- Tobacco tea, which contains nicotine and is traditionally used by the indigenous peoples of the Americas as a medicine for various ills (dizziness, headaches), as a laxative, as an emetic, and as an expectorant.

=== Non-caffeinated and non-psychoactive infusions ===
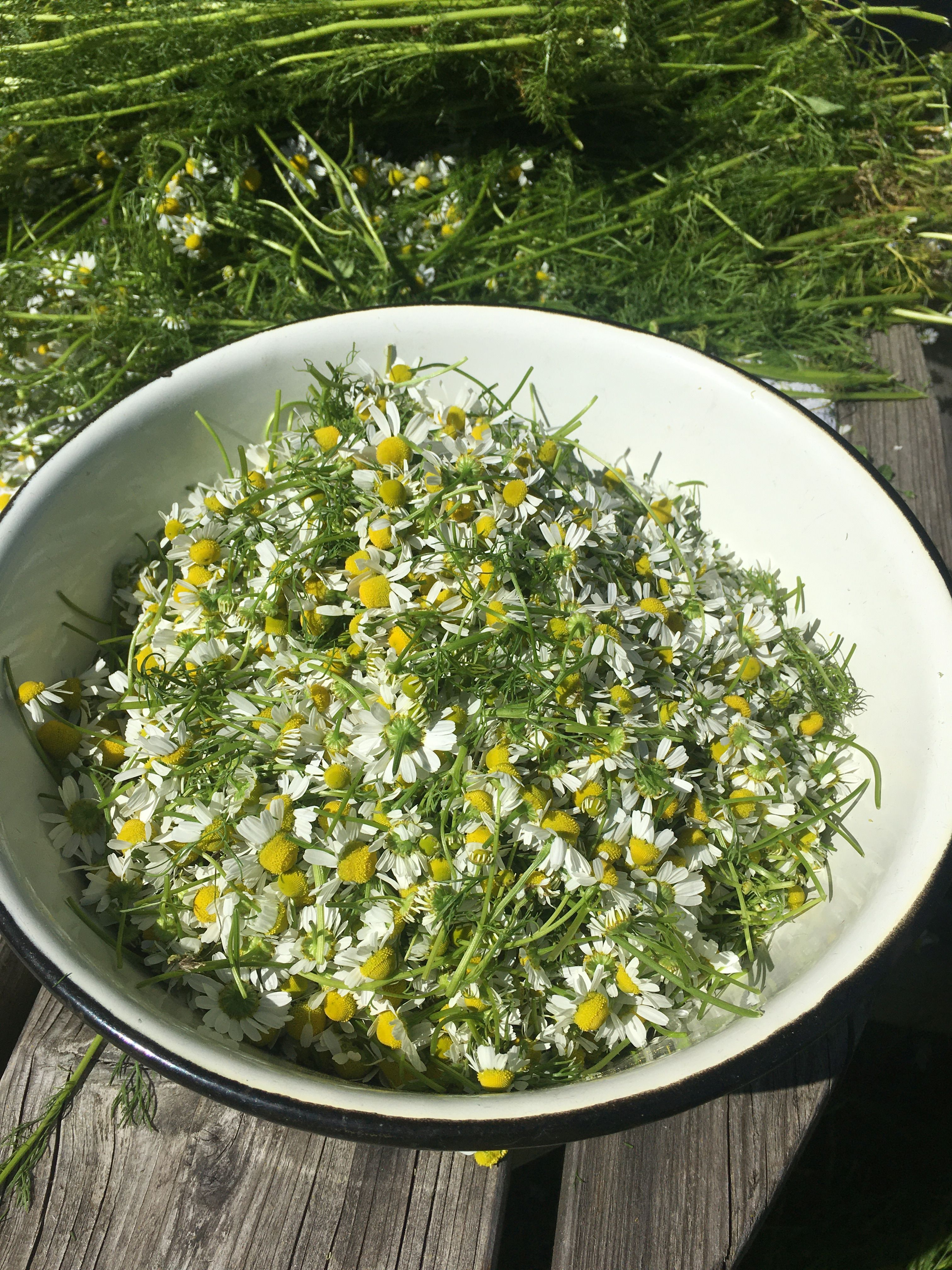
Matricaria chamomilla flower heads separated from stems

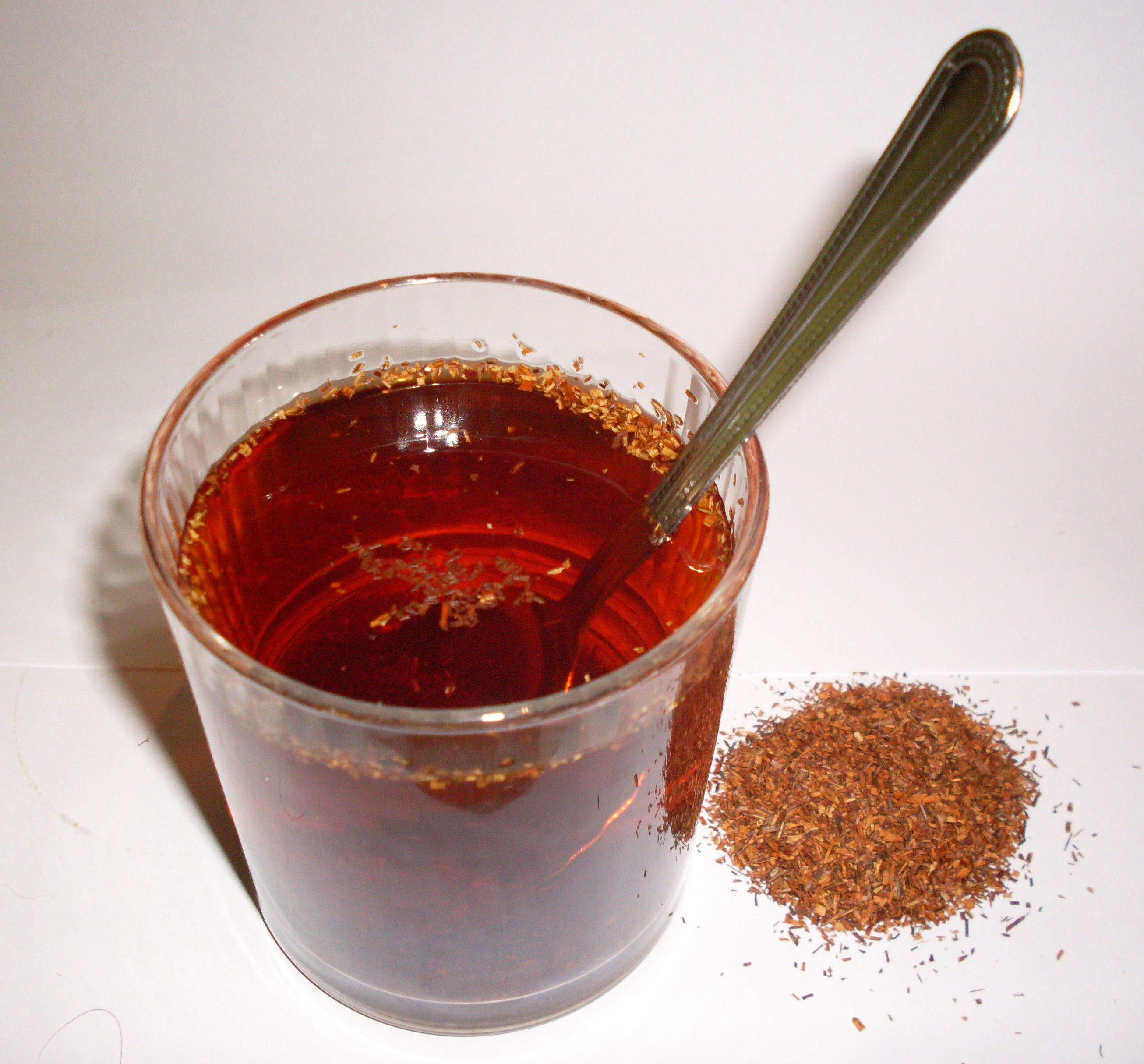
Rooibos tea, a common drink in South Africa

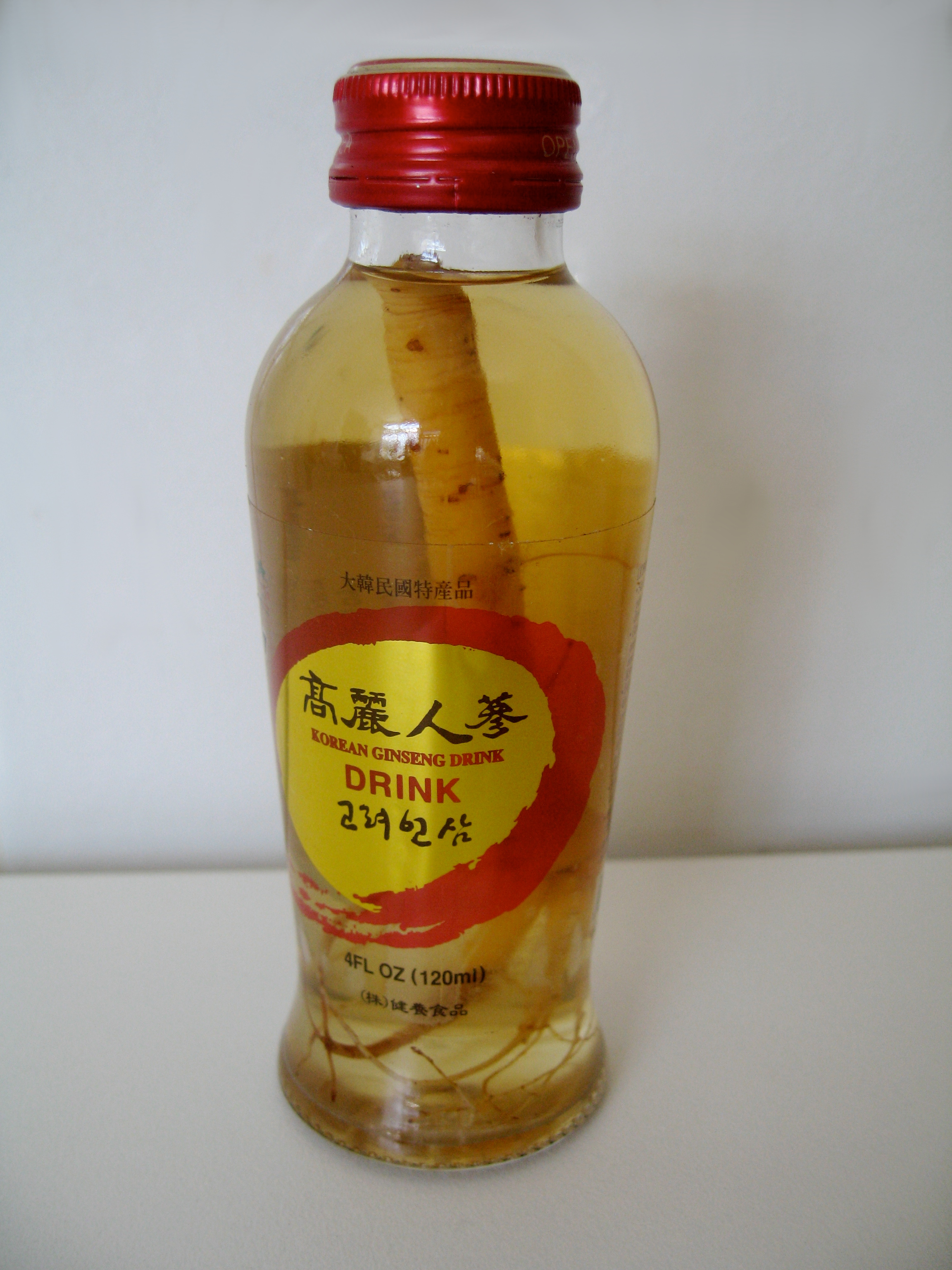
Bottled ginseng tea from Korea

- Anise tea, made from either the seeds or the leaves
- Asiatic penny-wort leaf, in South Asia and Southeast Asia
- Artichoke tea
- Commiphora gileadensis tea, in the Hejaz region of western Arabia
- Bael fruit tea
- Barley tea, East Asian drink with roasted barley
- Bee balm
- Boldo, used in South America
- Burdock; the seeds, leaves, and roots have been used
- Butterfly pea flower tea (from Clitoria ternatea), also called "blue tea" since it produces a blue infusion
- Caraway tea, made from the seeds
- Catnip tea, used as a relaxant, sedative, and to calm
- Chamomile; both Matricaria chamomilla and Chamaemelum nobile can be used
- Che dang, bitter tea made from Ilex causue leaves
- Chinese knotweed tea
- Chrysanthemum tea, made from dried flowers
- Cinnamon tea
- Clover tea, made from the blossoms
- Cerasse, bitter Jamaican herb
- Citrus peel, including bergamot, lemon, and orange peel
- Dandelion coffee, which does not contain caffeine despite the name
- Dill tea
- Dried lime tea, made from dried limes common in western Asia
- Echinacea tea
- Elderberry
- European mistletoe (Viscum album), steeped in cold water for 2–6 hours
- Essiac tea, blended herbal tea
- Fennel
- Gentian
- Ginger tea, made from the ginger root; can be made into herbal tea, known in the Philippines as salabat
- Ginkgo biloba
- Ginseng tea, a common tea in China and Korea, commonly used as a stimulant and as a caffeine substitute
- Goji berry tea
- Hawthorn
- Hibiscus tea (often blended with rose hip), a common tea in the Middle East or Asia
- Honeybush, similar to rooibos and growing in a nearby area of South Africa, but tasting slightly sweeter. It has a low tannin content and no caffeine.
- Horehound
- Houttuynia
- Hydrangea tea, dried leaves of hydrangeas; considerable care must be taken because most species contain a toxin. The "safe" hydrangeas belong to the Hydrangea serrata Amacha ("sweet tea") cultivar group.
- Jasmine flower tea; though it is commonly blended with tea leaves, jasmine flowers are also sometimes infused on their own
- Jiaogulan (also known as xiancao or "poor man's ginseng")
- Kapor tea, dried leaves of fireweed
- Kelp tea, East Asian tea made from kelp, known as konbu-cha in Japan
- Kuzuyu, a thick white Japanese tea made by adding kudzu flour to hot water
- Labrador tea, made from the shrub by the same name, found in the northern part of North America
- Lavender tea
- Lemon balm
- Lemon and ginger tea
- Lemongrass tea
- Luo han guo
- Licorice root
- Lime blossom, dried flowers of the lime tree (tilia in Latin).
- Meadowsweet herb
- Mint herbal tea, made from various mints, especially peppermint and spearmint. It is also commonly mixed with green tea, as in Maghrebi mint tea. Korean mint tea is one popular pure mint herbal tea.
- Mound of termites tea in Merauke
- Moringa
- Mountain tea, common in the Balkans and other areas of the Mediterranean region. It is made from a variety of the Sideritis syriaca plant which grows in warm climates above 3,000 feet. Records of its use date back 2,000 years.
- Dried flowers of the mullein
- Neem leaf
- Nettle leaf
- New Jersey tea (Ceanothus americanus), which has a mild blood pressure lowering effect.
- Noni tea
- Oksusu-cha, traditional roasted corn tea found in Korea
- Olive leaf tea
- Oregano tea
- Osmanthus tea, dried flowers of the sweet olive tree, are used alone or blended with tea leaves in China.
- Pandan tea
- Patchouli tea
- Pennyroyal leaf, an abortifacient
- Pine needle tea, or tallstrunt, made from needles of pine trees
- Qishr, Yemeni drink with coffee husks and ginger
- Red clover tea
- Red raspberry leaf
- Rosa × damascena tea, in the Middle East.
- Roasted wheat, used in Postum, a coffee substitute
- Rooibos (red bush), a reddish plant used to make an infusion and grown in South Africa. In the US it is sometimes called red tea. It has many of the antioxidant characteristics of green tea, but because it does not come from tea leaves, it has no caffeine.
- Rose hip (often blended with hibiscus)
- Roselle petals, a species of hibiscus; known by other names including bissau and dah; consumed in the Sahel and elsewhere
- Rosemary
- Sabah snake grass is used as a traditional herbal tea infusion in Southeast Asia
- Sagebrush, California sagebrush
- Sage
- Sakurayu, Japanese herbal tea made with pickled cherry blossom petals
- Sassafras roots were steeped to make tea, a practice which was common among Native Americans. They were also used in the flavoring of root beer until being banned by the FDA.
- Scorched rice, known as hyeonmi-cha in Korea
- Skullcap
- Shallot peel tea from Kalimantan
- Serendib tea, from Sri Lanka
- Sobacha
- Spicebush (Lindera benzoin) leaves, used to make a tea by some native peoples of eastern North America
- Spruce tea, made from needles of spruce trees
- Staghorn sumac fruit can be made into a lemonade
- Stevia, can be used to make herbal tea, or as a sweetener in other beverages
- Sweet potato leaf tea, a common herbal tea in Chinese medicine
- Thyme, contains thymol
- Tulsi, or holy basil
- Turmeric tea
- Uncaria tomentosa, commonly known as cat's claw
- Valerian is used as a sedative, but clinical evidence for its psychoactive properties are inconclusive.
- Verbena (vervain)
- Wax gourd in East Asia and Southeast Asia
- Wong Lo Kat, a recipe for herbal tea from Guangdong, China since the Qing Dynasty
- Woodruff
- Yarrow

== Health risks ==
While most herbal teas are safe for regular consumption, some herbs have toxic or allergenic effects. Among the greatest causes of concern are:

- Comfrey, which contains alkaloids which may be harmful to the liver from chronic use, and particularly is not recommended during pregnancy or when prescription drugs are used; comfrey is not recommended for oral use.
- Lobelia, which contains alkaloids and has traditional medicine uses for smoking cessation; may cause nausea, vomiting, or dizziness at high doses.

Herbal teas can also have different effects from person to person, and this is further compounded by the problem of potential misidentification. The deadly foxglove, for example, can be mistaken for the much more benign (but still relatively toxic to the liver) comfrey. Care must be taken not to use any poisonous plants.

The US does not require herbal teas to have any evidence concerning their efficacy, but does treat them technically as food products and require that they be safe for consumption.

Fruit or fruit-flavored tea is usually acidic and thus may contribute to erosion of tooth enamel.

=== Adverse herb–drug interactions ===
Some phytochemicals found in herbs and fruits can adversely interact with others and over the counter or prescription medications, among other ways by affecting their metabolism by the body. Herbs and fruits that inhibit or induce the body's Cytochrome P450 enzyme complex function can either cause the drug to be dangerously ineffective, or increase its effective absorbed dose to potentially toxic levels, respectively. The best known examples of adverse herb‑drug interactions are grapefruit or St. John's wort, contraindicated for several medications including Paxlovid and oral contraceptives, but other herbs also affect the CYP enzyme family, showing herb‑drug interactions.

=== Contamination ===
Depending on the source of the herbal ingredients, herbal teas, like any crop, may be contaminated with pesticides or heavy metals. According to Naithani & Kakkar (2004), "all herbal preparations should be checked for toxic chemical residues to allay consumer fears of exposure to known neuro-toxicant pesticides and to aid in promoting global acceptance of these products".

== See also ==
- List of hot beverages
- Tea culture
- Health effects of tea
- Tincture, the often more concentrated plant extracts made in pure grain alcohol, glycerin, or vinegar
- Yerba mate
- Hot chocolate
- Coffee substitute
- Tea in France
- Chinese sweet tea
