= Coffee tea =

Coffee tea refers to herbal tea made from non-bean parts of the coffea (coffee plant), and may refer to:

- Coffee-leaf tea
- Coffee cherry tea
- Ground coffee, brewed in a coffee bag, like bagged tea, is referred to simply as "coffee", and is similar to filter coffee.
- Yuanyang (drink), a drink combining coffee and tea
