= P. tabuliformis =

P. tabuliformis may refer to:

- Pinus tabuliformis, the Chinese red pine, a pine species native to northern China
- Pitcairnia tabuliformis, a plant species endemic to Mexico
