= Aida Batlle =

Salvadoran coffee farmer and businesswoman

- Born: 1973 or 1974 (age 51–52); El Salvador
- Occupation: Coffee farmer
- Years active: 2002-present
- Known for: Single-origin coffee beans

Aida Batlle is a Salvadoran coffee farmer and businesswoman. She won El Salvador's inaugural Cup of Excellence competition in 2003 with her Finca Kilimanjaro, one year after she began farming coffee.

Batlle focuses on organic methods and hand-harvesting fully-ripened coffee cherry to produce single-origin coffee beans.

== Early life ==
Batlle's family had farmed coffee in El Salvador for four generations. Her great-great-grandfather, Narciso Avilés, the governor of Santa Ana Province, is credited with bringing the Bourbon coffee bean to El Salvador from Guatemala in the late nineteenth or early twentieth century.

The family left El Salvador during the country's civil war when she was six and lived in Miami, Florida, where Batlle grew up. She married and moved to Nashville, Tennessee, then when her marriage ended she returned to El Salvador.

== Coffee farming ==
Batlle returned to El Salvador in 2002 at the age of 28. Her father, Mauricio Batlle, was farming the family's land, but commodity coffee prices were at historic lows—US$0.40 per pound in 2001—and the business was unprofitable. Batlle settled in Santa Ana and took over the coffee farming business. Batlle, who knew very little about coffee or coffee farming at the time, did know that coffee was a fruit, and she decided to grow it and treat it as an organic ripe-picked fruit, which at the time was highly unusual; most coffee growers were aiming for highest production at lowest cost, which meant industrial growing methods and machine harvesting of unripened coffee cherry. She faced significant pushback from the farm managers, who were used to commodity coffee production.

In 2003 she entered her Finca Kilimanjaro coffee in El Salvador's inaugural Cup of Excellence, and it won first place. The prize in the Cup of Excellence is the auction that follows; Batlle's Finca Kilimanjaro product was purchased at auction by a Norwegian roaster for US$14.06 a pound, which was at the time a record. In 2003 commodity product was bringing less than $1 per pound. Production from the other farm she entered, Finca Los Alpes, won 16th place. The wins convinced her father and the farm managers that "coddling" the coffee cherry could be a good business strategy. They also helped her make relationships in the artisanal coffee industry which was at the time just developing.

After the 2003 Cup of Excellence competition, Batlle learned coffee cupping. In 2010 she earned a certification from the Barista Guild of America, the first coffee farmer to do so.

Batlle operates three family coffee farms, Finca Los Alpes, Finca Kilimanjaro, and Finca Mauritania and an additional farm she owns personally, Finca Tanzania. With the four farms she can produce about thirty tons of coffee beans, if the weather is good and the farms don't experience theft by armed pickers. When she is travelling around her farms, Batlle uses a bulletproof car and is accompanied by armed guards and a dog.

Batlle has worked with artisanal roasters Sweet Maria's, Counter Culture, Stumptown and Blue Bottle.

== Cascara ==
Batlle developed a secondary market for coffee cherry skins, which are dried to create cascara, a tea. Around 2005 she noticed the coffee cherry husks, which are commonly discarded in the milling process, had a floral aroma, and she decided to try brewing tea from them. Cascara in Spanish means skin or peel of fruit. Other growers also began selling their coffee cherry pulp and skins as teas. It can be dried and flaked like ground tea or dried into raisinlike pieces, both of which are prepared with hot water. It is served hot, iced, carbonated, and bottled by various producers, including as a beer. Hashara and quishr are similar drinks traditional in Ethiopia and Yemen.

== Methods ==
Batlle uses organic methods and focusses on hand-harvesting of ripe beans, sorting them by color to isolate flavors. She pays her pickers double the going rate because the work is so much more exacting than typical coffee harvesting. The most common cultivar on her farms is bourbon. She also grows pacamara and Kenyan.

== Recognition ==
In 2013 Time said she was leading the coffee industry's third wave, or movement toward single-origin artisanally-produced coffee and recognition of terroir and the properties of individual bean varieties.

In 2014 Good magazine named Batlle to their list of 100 innovators. Batlle works as a consultant to designate other growers' coffees as an "Aida Batlle Selection", which commands a premium.
