= Cascara =

Cascara may refer to:

- Rhamnus purshiana, a plant known for its laxative properties
- Coffee cherry tea, an herbal tea
- Cáscara (rhythm), a Cuban rhythm played on the side of the timbales
- Cascara, a fictional Caribbean island in the film Water

== See also ==
- Kaskara
