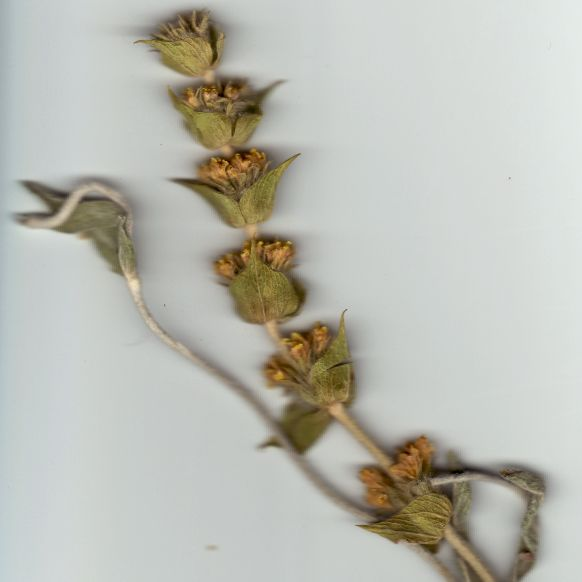

Scientific classification
- Kingdom: Plantae
- Clade: Tracheophytes
- Clade: Angiosperms
- Clade: Eudicots
- Clade: Asterids
- Order: Lamiales
- Family: Lamiaceae
- Genus: Sideritis
- Species: S. syriaca

Binomial name
- Sideritis syriaca L. (1753)

Synonyms
- Navicularia syriaca (L.) Soják (1979 publ. 1980)

= Sideritis syriaca =

Species of flowering plant

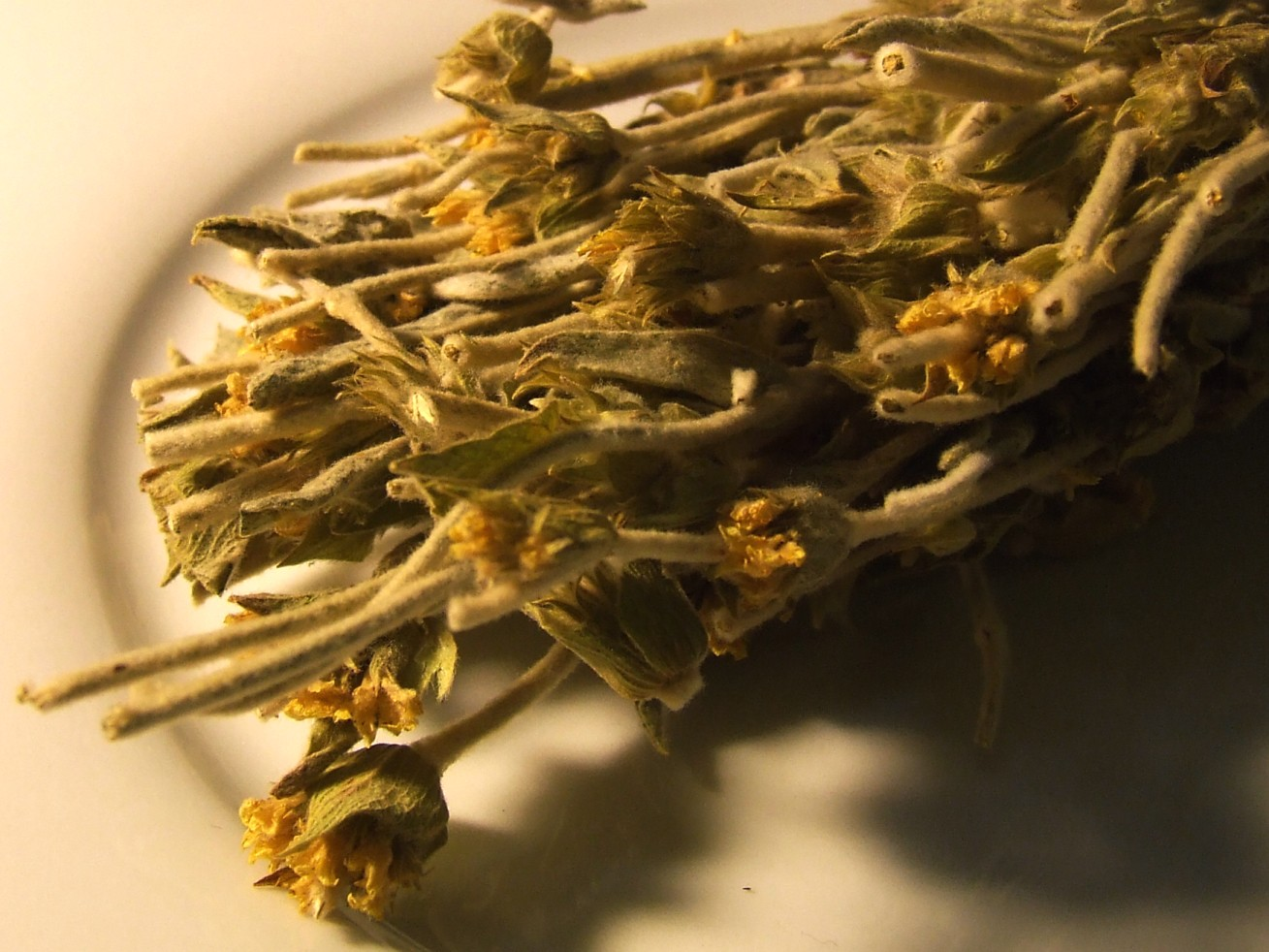
Ironwort

Sideritis syriaca, commonly known as ironwort, is a species of perennial flowering plant native to Albania, Greece, Crete, Turkey, and Syria in the eastern Mediterranean. It grows at high elevations in the mountains. It is commonly found on wet grounds, on the high pastures, above 1,500 metres (4,900 ft).

It is similar to chamomile and used in the Balkans (where it is known as "mountain tea") to make a tisane.

In Bulgaria, Sideritis syriaca is a critically endangered species inscribed in the Red Data Book of the Republic of Bulgaria. It's only found in the wild in the Malko Tarnovo area of Strandzha Nature Park, but it's also cultivated locally elsewhere in Strandzha. The Bulgarian Strandzha herbal tea (Странджански билков чай, Strandzhanski bilkov chay) made of dried Sideritis has protected designation of origin status in the EU.

== Subspecies ==
Two subspecies are accepted.

- Sideritis syriaca subsp. nusairiensis (Post) Hub.-Mor. – southern Turkey and western Syria
- Sideritis syriaca subsp. syriaca – Crete
