= Coffee-leaf tea =

Tea prepared from the leaves of the coffee plant

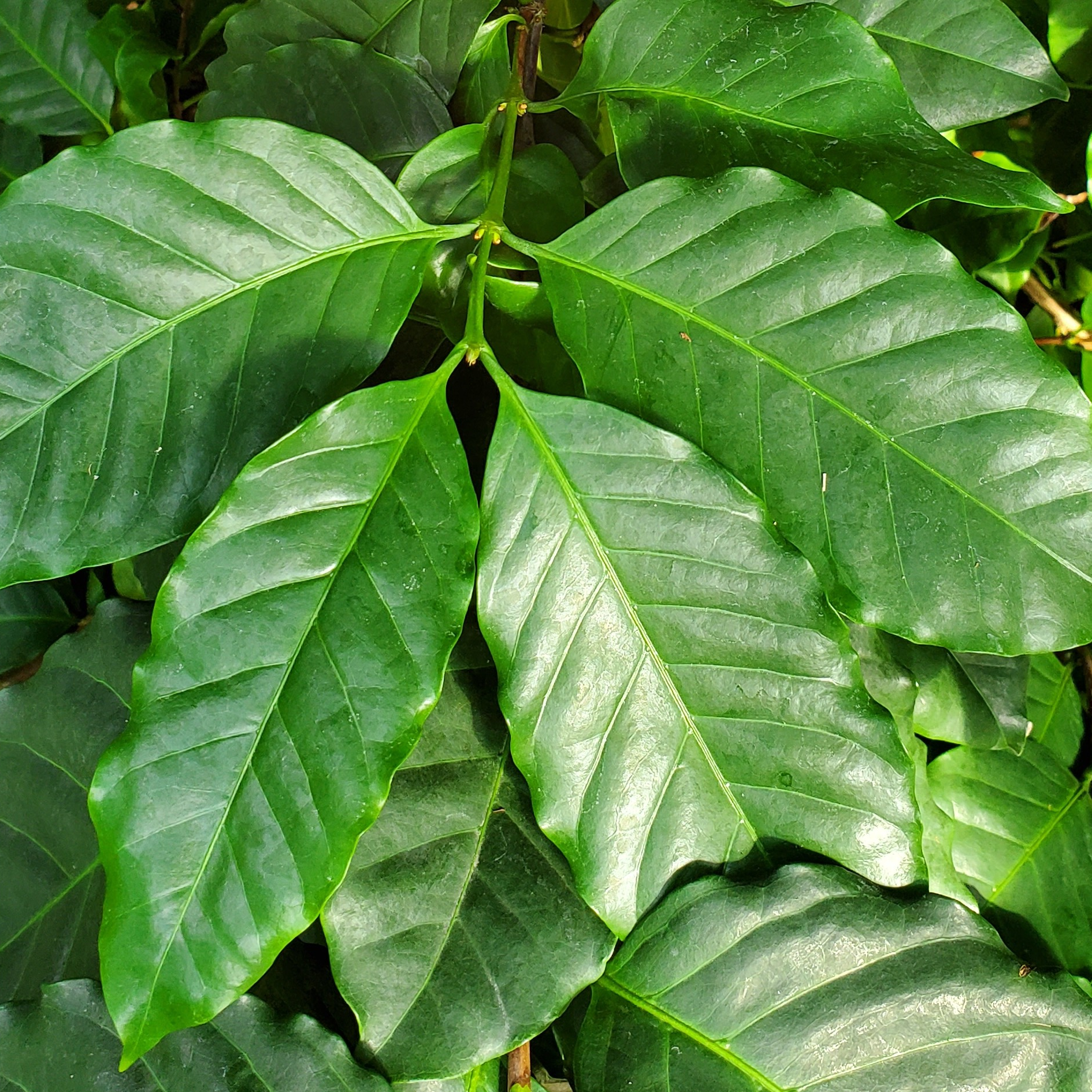
Coffee leaves can be prepared as an herbal tea.

Coffee-leaf tea is a herbal tea prepared from the leaves of the coffee plant (either Coffea robusta or Coffea arabica). These leaves, after being roasted, can be ground up or crumpled, then brewed or steeped in hot water in a form similar to tea. The resulting beverage is similar in taste to green tea, but with less caffeine content than either regular tea or coffee. Coffee leaves closely resemble the leaves and stalks of Paraguay tea (Ilex paraguariensis). In some regions, such as Sumatra and Ethiopia, only the leaves are taken from the coffee plant and the berries are left on the bush.

In Ethiopia, coffee-leaf tea is called kuti and has been consumed for hundreds of years.

== See also ==
- Coffee cherry tea
- Qishr, a Yemeni drink using coffee husks
