= Pine needle tea =

Herbal tea made from pine needles

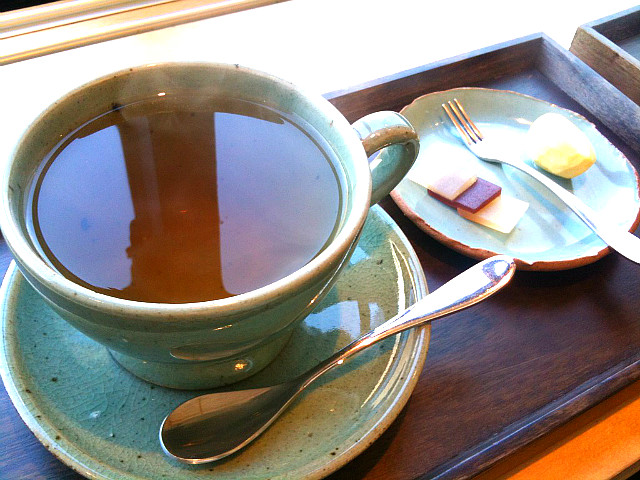
- Type: Herbal tea
- Other names: Pine leaf tea; sollip-cha; jannip-cha; baegyeop-da
- Origin: East Asia
- Quick description: Tea made from pine needles
- Temperature: 85–100 °C (185–212 °F)
- Time: 3‒20 minutes

P. densiflora needle tea P. tabuliformis needle tea
- Hangul: 솔잎차
- Hanja: 솔잎茶
- RR: sollipcha
- MR: sollipch'a
- IPA: [sol.lip̚.tɕʰa]

P. koraiensis needle tea
- Hangul: 잣잎차; 백엽다
- Hanja: 잣잎茶; 柏葉茶
- RR: jannipcha; baegyeopda
- MR: channipch'a; paegyŏpta
- IPA: [tɕan.nip̚.tɕʰa]; [pɛ.ɡjʌp̚.t͈a]

Pine needle tea or pine leaf tea is a herbal tea made from pine needles, or the leaves of pine trees (trees of the genus Pinus). In Korea, the tea made from the leaves of Korean red pine (P. densiflora) or Manchurian red pine (P. tabuliformis) is known as sollip-cha (솔잎차), while the tea made from the leaves of Korean pine (P. koraiensis) is known as jannip-cha (잣잎차) or baek yeop-Cha (백엽 차). In North America, pine needle tea may be made from the leaves of Eastern white pine (P. strobus) and Loblolly, Virginia Pine, Long Leaf Pine. The Douglas fir may also be used.

== Preparation ==
=== Sollip-cha ===
Sollip-cha is a herbal tea made mostly from the needles of Korean red pine or Manchurian red pine. Pine needles are usually harvested around December, preferably before midday, from 10- to 20-year-old trees located mid-mountain and facing southeast, that have grown in sunny places. Two types of sollip-cha can be made:

The first method uses fresh or dried pine needles. The harvested needles are soaked in water for a day, then cleaned, rinsed, trimmed of the sharp tips, and cut into two or three pieces. They can be used right away or dried in a shaded area before being used. For 60 millilitres (2.1 imp fl oz; 2.0 US fl oz) of water, 10–15 grams (0.35–0.53 oz) of dried pine needles or 20–30 grams (0.71–1.06 oz) of fresh pine needles are infused over low heat. As the tea has the properties of an astringent, honey or sugar is added to improve the taste.

The second method uses fermented pine needles. The harvested needles are trimmed of their sharp tips, washed, and placed in a sugar solution made with 600 millilitres (21 imp fl oz; 20 US fl oz) water and 100 grams (3.5 oz) of sugar. The mixture is then fermented in a sunny place for a week (in summer) or more (in other seasons). Well-fermented sollip-cha is filtered with cloth and consumed as cold tea.

=== Jannip-cha ===
The leaves that grow eastward are harvested for making the tea. 50 grams (1.8 oz) of fresh pine needles are washed, drained, and boiled in 300 millilitres (11 imp fl oz; 10 US fl oz) water. When it comes to a boil, it is brewed on a low heat, and drunk without the leaves.

== See also ==
- Aneda - used by the St. Lawrence Iroquoians to cure scurvy, sometimes described as "pine needle tea", though more commonly thought to have been Thuja occidentalis
