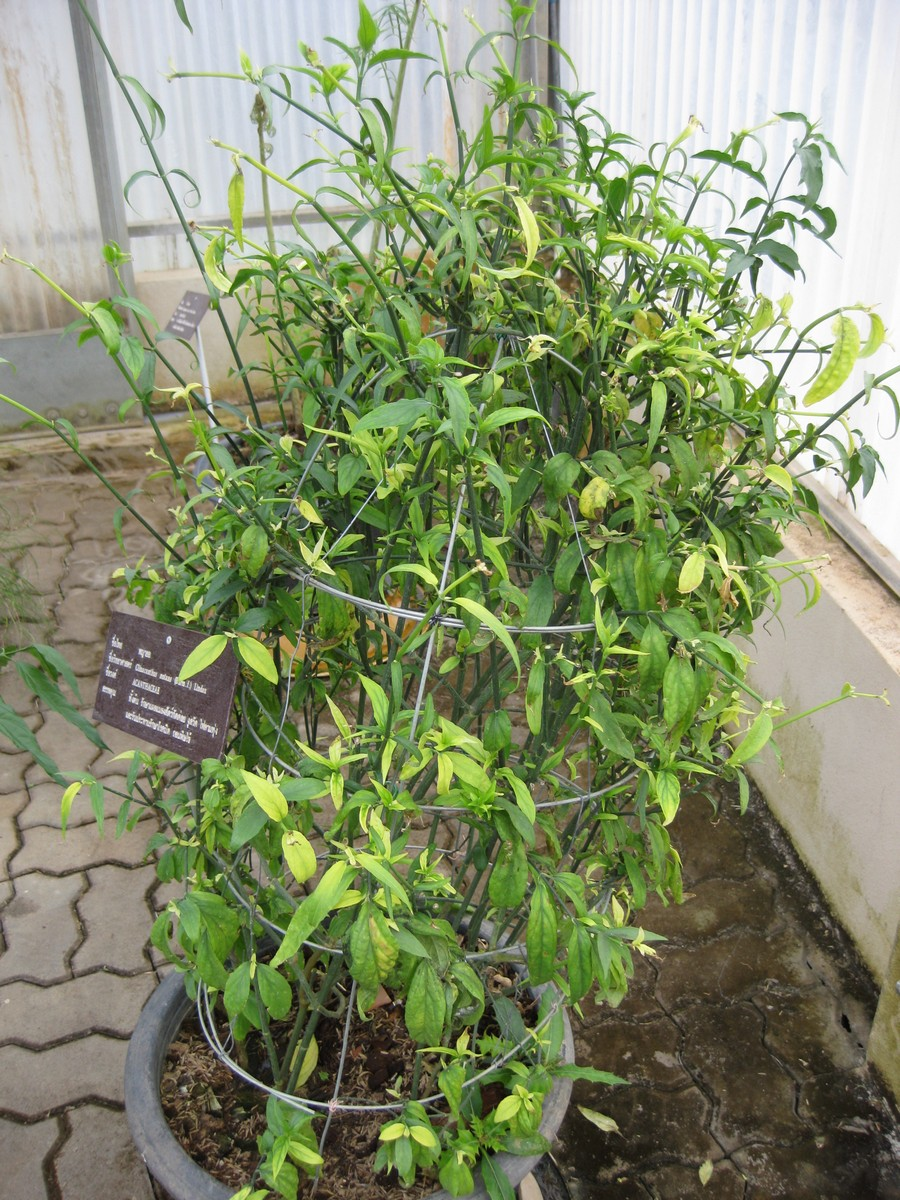

Scientific classification
- Kingdom: Plantae
- Clade: Tracheophytes
- Clade: Angiosperms
- Clade: Eudicots
- Clade: Asterids
- Order: Lamiales
- Family: Acanthaceae
- Subfamily: Acanthoideae
- Tribe: Justicieae
- Genus: Clinacanthus; Nees (1847)

= Clinacanthus =

Genus of flowering plants

Clinacanthus is a genus of flowering plants belonging to the family Acanthaceae.

Its native range is southern China to western Malesia.

Species:

- Clinacanthus nutans (Burm.f.) Lindau
- Clinacanthus robinsoni (Benoist) Bongch. & I.Darbysh.
- Clinacanthus siamensis Bremek.
- Clinacanthus spirei Benoist
