= Chinese sweet tea =

Chinese herbal tea

Chinese sweet tea, also known as Tian-cha (Chinese: 甜茶; pinyin: tiánchá; Jyutping: tin4 caa4), is a traditional Chinese herbal tea, made from the leaves of Chinese blackberry (Rubus suavissimus). These leaves contain a natural sweetener, called rubusoside, which is 200 times as sweet as cane sugar. The tea has long been used to alleviate kidney symptoms, and a recent Japanese study also indicates that it has anti-inflammatory effects and helps against allergies.

== See also ==
- Chinese herb tea
