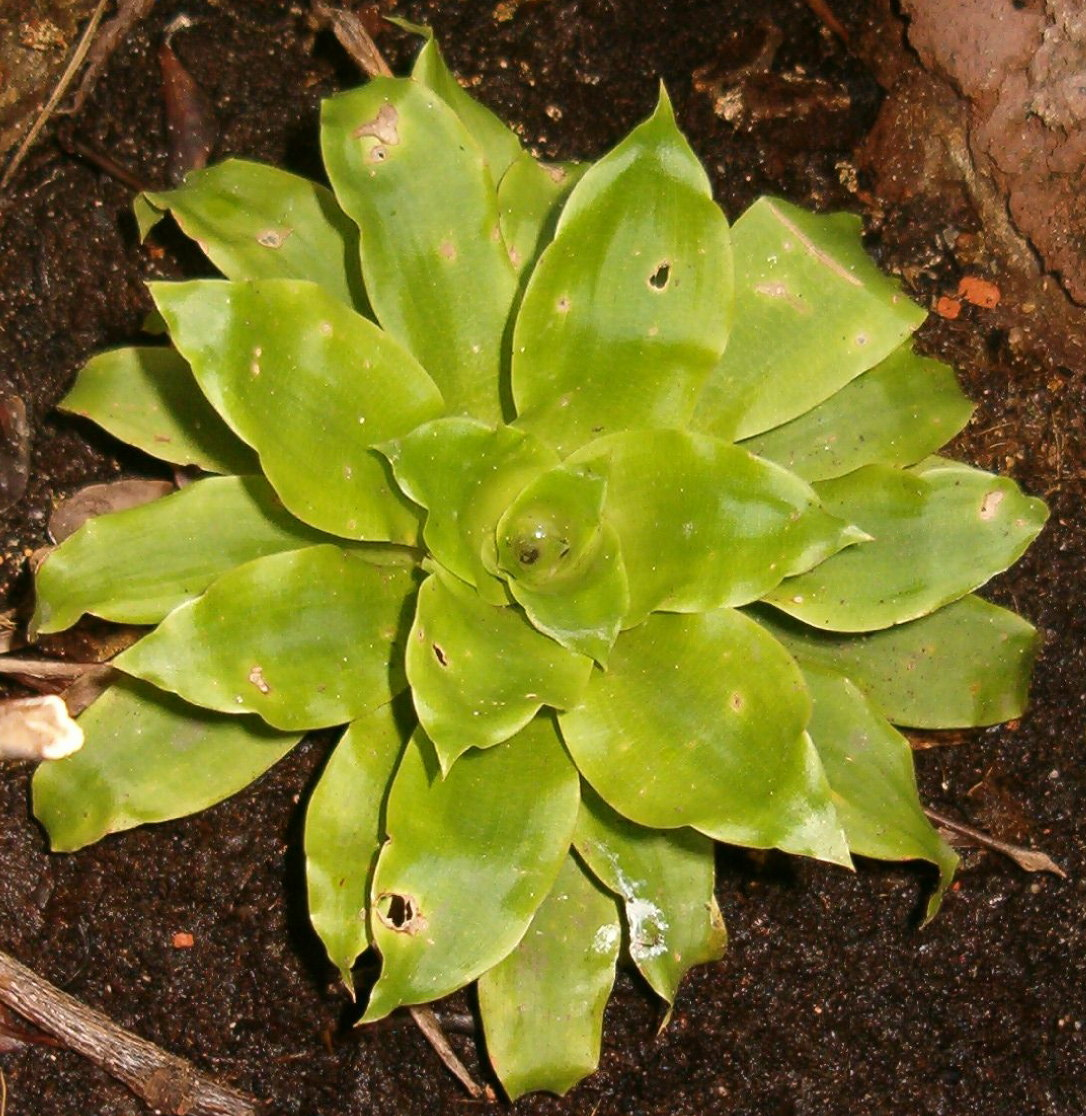

Scientific classification
- Kingdom: Plantae
- Clade: Tracheophytes
- Clade: Angiosperms
- Clade: Monocots
- Clade: Commelinids
- Order: Poales
- Family: Bromeliaceae
- Genus: Pitcairnia
- Species: P. tabuliformis

Binomial name
- Pitcairnia tabuliformis Linden

Synonyms
- Hepetis tabuliformis (Linden) Mez

= Pitcairnia tabuliformis =

Species of flowering plant

Pitcairnia tabuliformis is a species of flowering plant in the family Bromeliaceae. It is native to Guatemala and Mexico.
