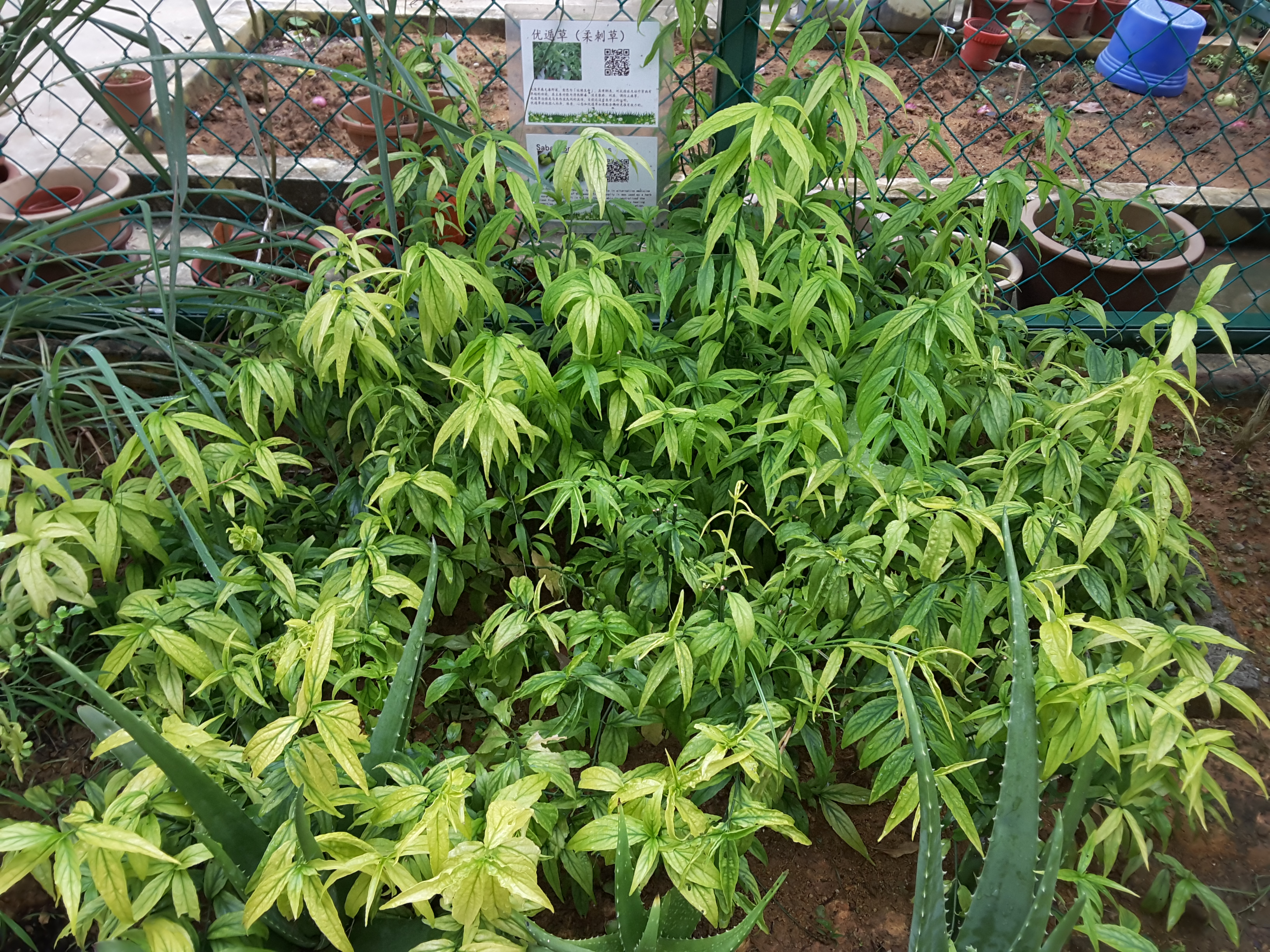

Scientific classification
- Kingdom: Plantae
- Clade: Tracheophytes
- Clade: Angiosperms
- Clade: Eudicots
- Clade: Asterids
- Order: Lamiales
- Family: Acanthaceae
- Genus: Clinacanthus
- Species: C. nutans

Binomial name
- Clinacanthus nutans (Burm.f.) Lindau

= Clinacanthus nutans =

Species of flowering plant

Clinacanthus nutans is a species of plant in the family Acanthaceae. It is also known by the common names belalai gajah (Malay), phaya yo (Thai), Sabah snake grass, ki tajam (Sunda), and dandang gendis (Jawa). This plant is used in the traditional herbal medicines of Malaysia, Indonesia, Thailand, and China. It has been used in Indonesia in the treatment of dysentery and diabetes.

== Description ==
Clinacanthus nutans is a herbaceous plant that grows in low shrubs up to 2.5 meters (8 ft 2 in) high. Its stems are green, woody, upright and cylindrical. Its leaves are green, simple, lanceolate with pointed tips and rounded bases, and are 8–12 cm (3.1–4.7 in) long and 4–6 cm (1.6–2.4 in) wide. Its flowers are red and panicle-shaped, with tube-shaped elongated petals 3.5 cm (1.4 in) long.

== Medicinal uses ==
It is used in treating skin rashes, insects and snake bites, lesions caused by herpes simplex virus, diabetes, and gout in Malaysia, Indonesia, Thailand and China.
