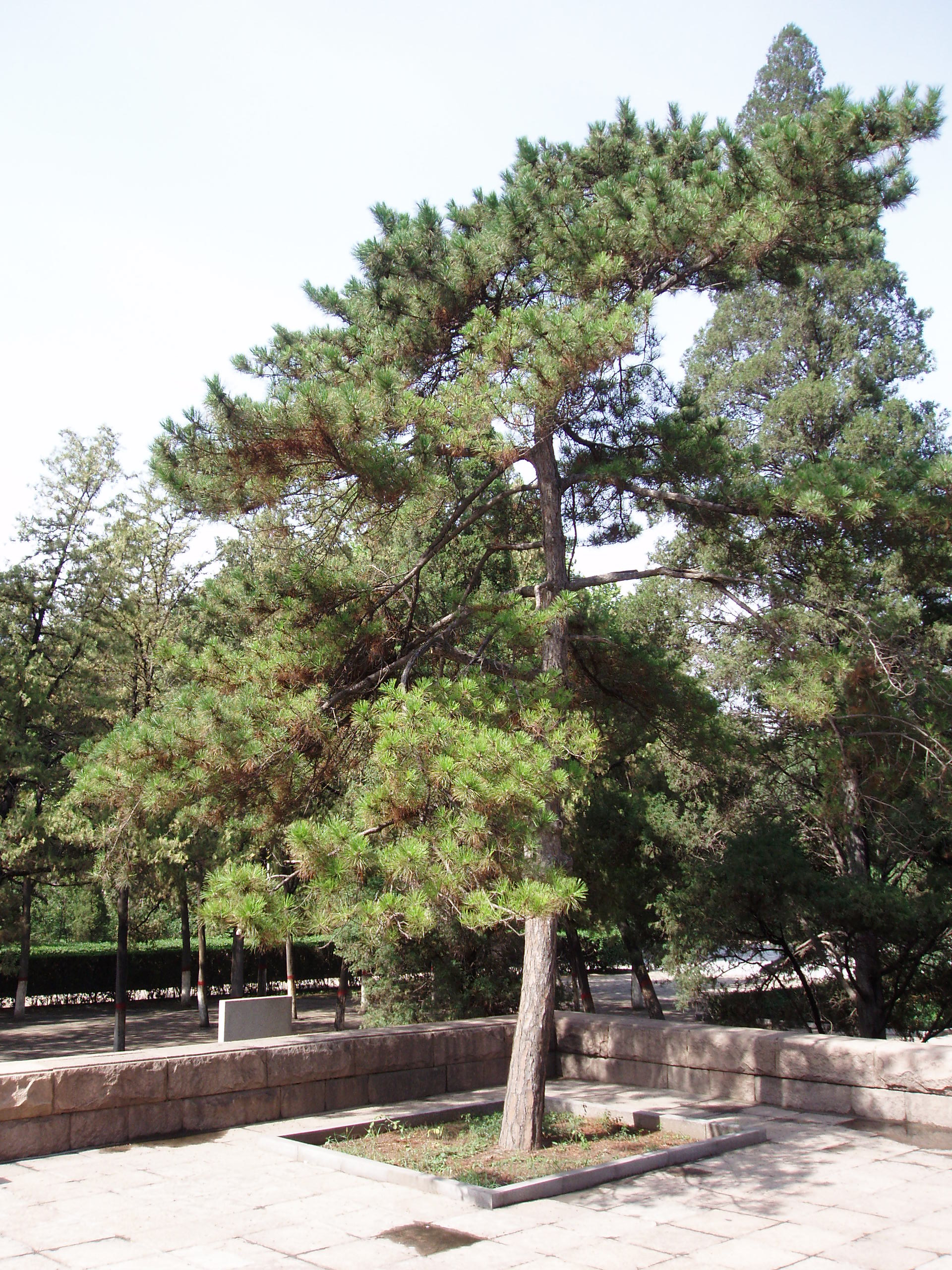

Conservation status
- Least Concern (IUCN 3.1)

Scientific classification
- Kingdom: Plantae
- Clade: Tracheophytes
- Clade: Gymnosperms
- Division: Pinophyta
- Class: Pinopsida
- Order: Pinales
- Family: Pinaceae
- Genus: Pinus
- Subgenus: P. subg. Pinus
- Section: P. sect. Pinus
- Subsection: P. subsect. Pinus
- Species: P. tabuliformis

Binomial name
- Pinus tabuliformis Carr.

= Pinus tabuliformis =

Species of conifer

Pinus tabuliformis, also called Chinese red pine, Manchurian red pine, or Southern Chinese pine is a species of conifer in the family Pinaceae, a pine native to northern China and northern Korea.

== Description ==
Pinus tabuliformis is a medium-sized coniferous tree growing to 20–30 metres (66–98 feet) tall, with a flat-topped crown when mature. The growth rate is fast when young, but slows with age. The grey-brown bark fissures at an early age compared to other trees. The broadly spreading shape is very pronounced, in part due to the long horizontal branching pattern.

The needle-like leaves are shiny grey-green, 10–17 centimetres (4–6 3/4 inches) long and 1.5 millimetres (1/16 in) broad, usually in pairs but occasionally in threes at the tips of strong shoots on young trees. The cones are green, ripening brown about 20 months after pollination, broad ovoid, 4–6 cm (1 5/8–2 3/8 in) long, with broad scales, each scale with a small prickle. The seeds are 6–7 mm (1/4–9/32 in) long with a 15–20 mm (9/16–13/16 in) wing, and are wind-dispersed.

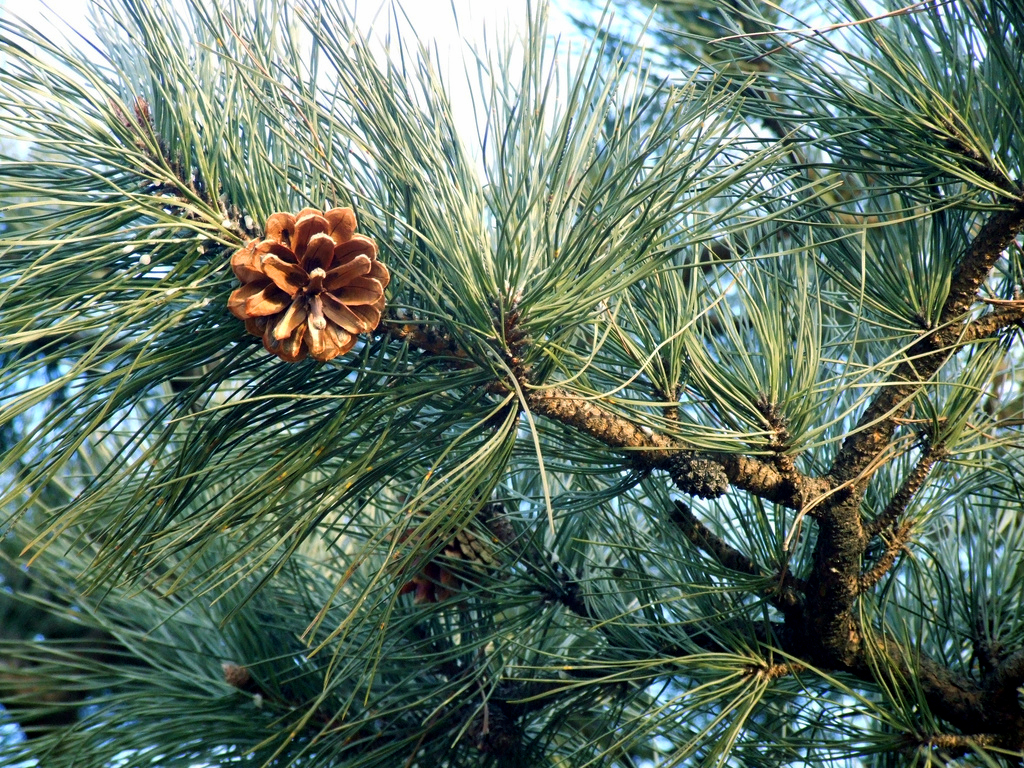
Foliage and cone

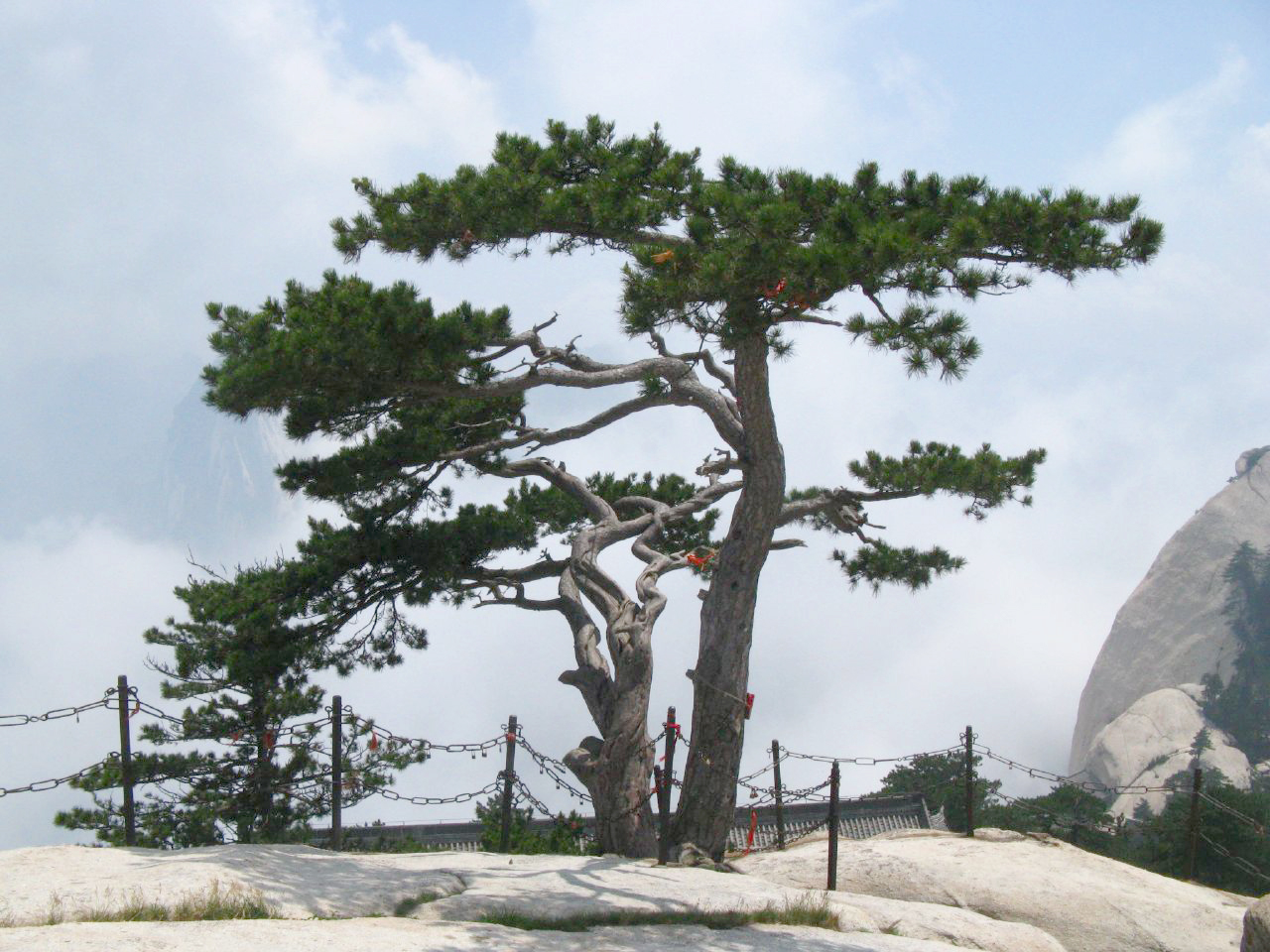
In Hua Shan, Shaanxi

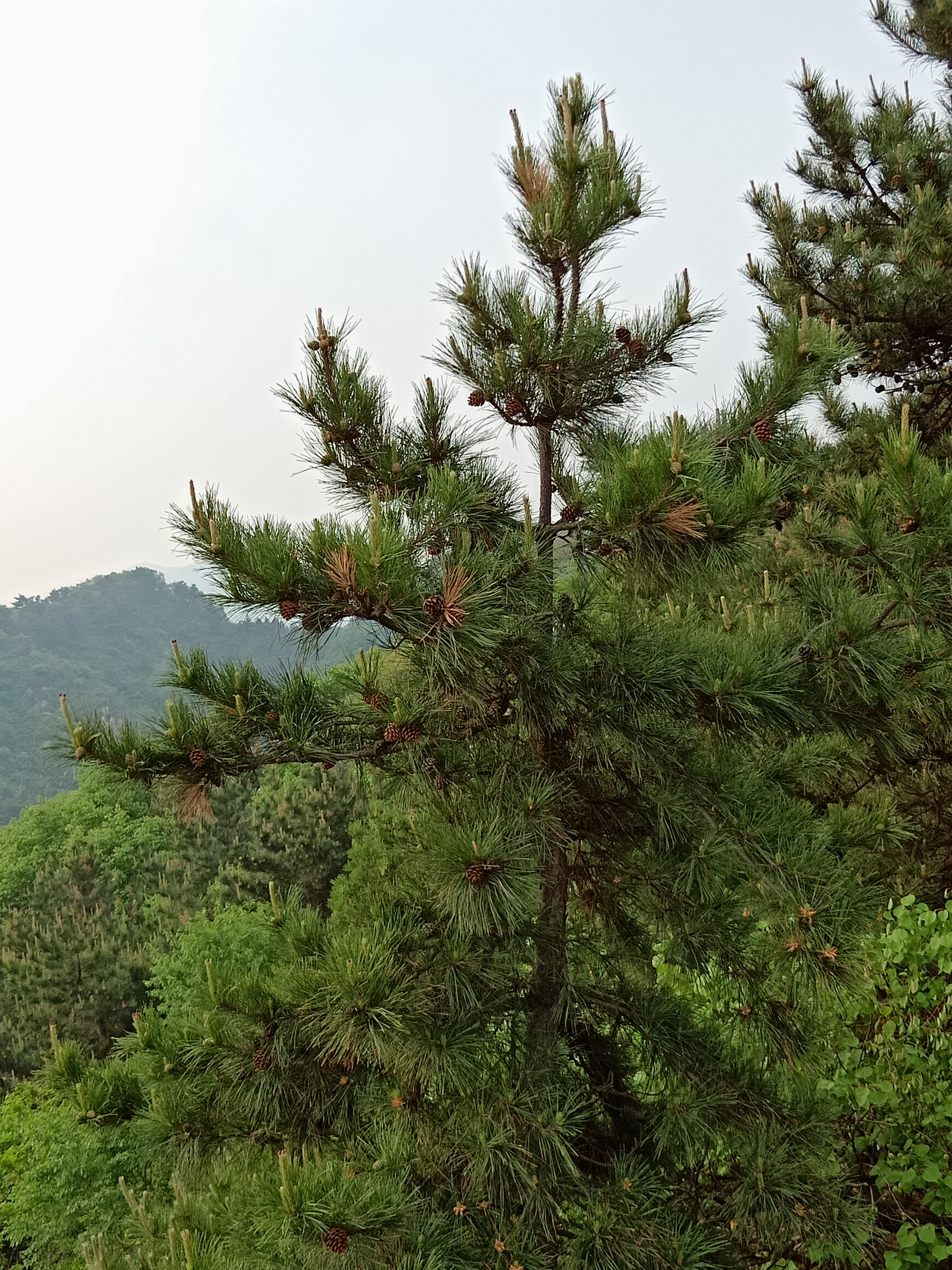
In Badaling, Hebei

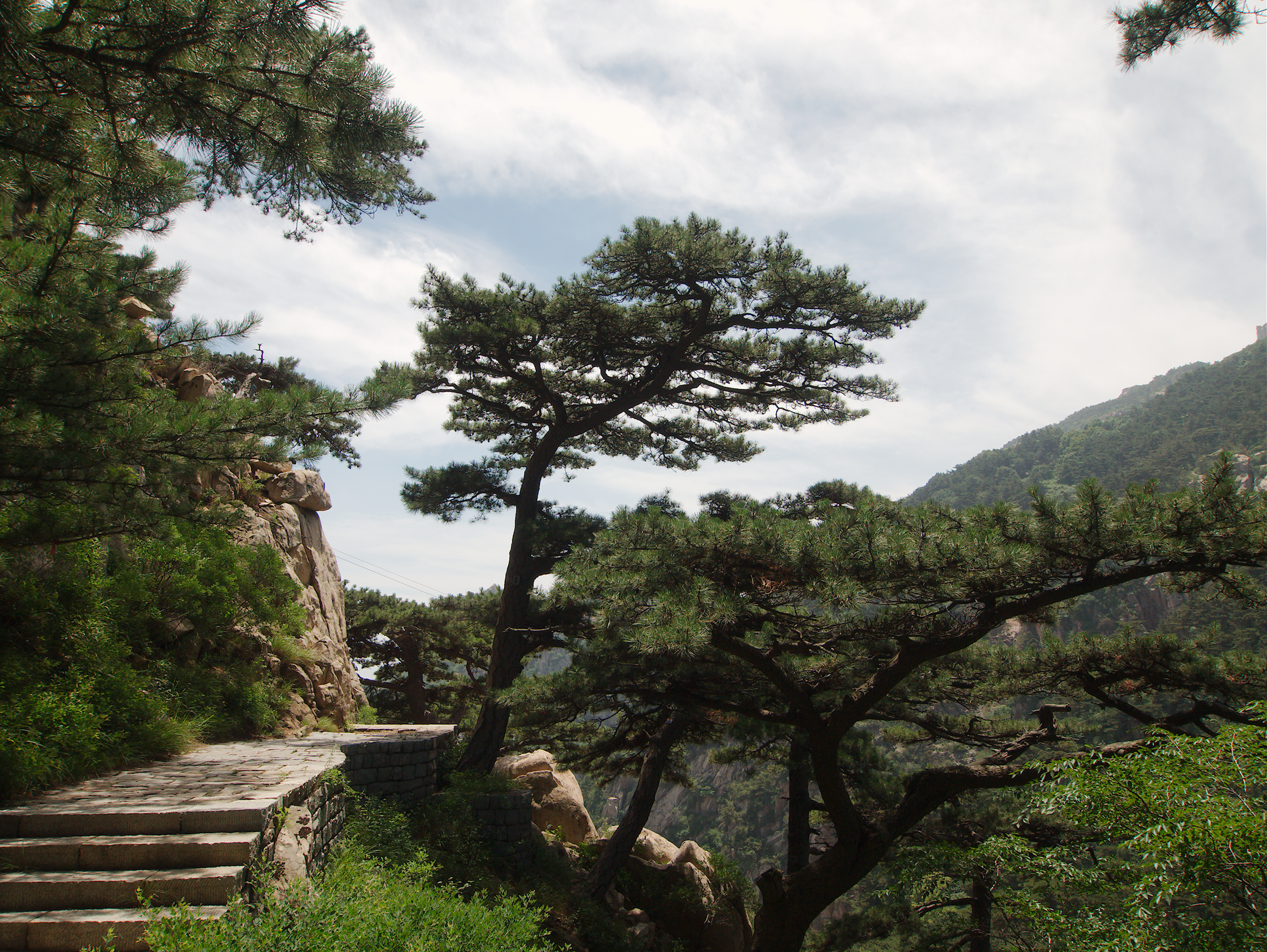
In Tai'an, Shandong

=== Varieties ===
There are two varieties:

- Pinus tabuliformis var. tabuliformis. China, except for Liaoning. Broadest cone scales under 15 mm broad.
- Pinus tabuliformis var. mukdensis. Liaoning, North Korea. Broadest cone scales over 15 mm broad.

Some botanists also treat the closely related Henry's pine (Pinus henryi) and Sikang pine (Pinus densata) as varieties of Chinese red pine; in some older texts even the very distinct Yunnan pine (Pinus yunnanensis) is included as a variety.

== Taxonomy ==
In some older texts the name is spelled "Pinus tabulaeformis".

The specific epithet, tabuliformis ('table-shaped'), refers to the species' flat-topped crown.

== Distribution and habitat ==
The species can be found in northern China from Liaoning west to Inner Mongolia and Gansu, and south to Shandong, Henan and Shaanxi, as well as northern Korea.

== Uses ==
The wood is used for general construction. The pulpwood produces certain resins that are used as artificial vanilla flavouring (vanillin). The resin is also used to make turpentine and related products, and is used medicinally to treat a variety respiratory and internal ailments, such as kidney and bladder upsets, wounds, and sores. The bark is a source of tannin. Medicinal use of the pine needles also takes place, which also contain a natural insecticide, as well as a source for a dye. The needles are used to brew pine needle tea (sollip-cha).

In the ancient Chinese Zhou dynasty, P. tabuliformis was an official memorial tree, being planted on temple grounds, and in graveyards near the tombs of kings.

It has been widely used for afforestation in Northwest China.

Its cultivation is uncommon outside of China, grown only in botanical gardens.
