= Chinese knotweed =

Chinese knotweed is a common name for several plants and may refer to:

- Koenigia weyrichii, native to east Asia
- Persicaria chinensis, widespread across China, Japan, India, Indonesia, Malaysia, and Vietnam
- Reynoutria multiflora, native to central and southern China
