= Turmeric tea =

Japanese tea made from turmeric

Turmeric tea (ukoncha (ウコン茶)) is a kind of tea which originates from Okinawa, in southern Japan. Ukoncha is made of the rhizomes of turmeric.
