= Coffee cherry tea =

Herbal tea

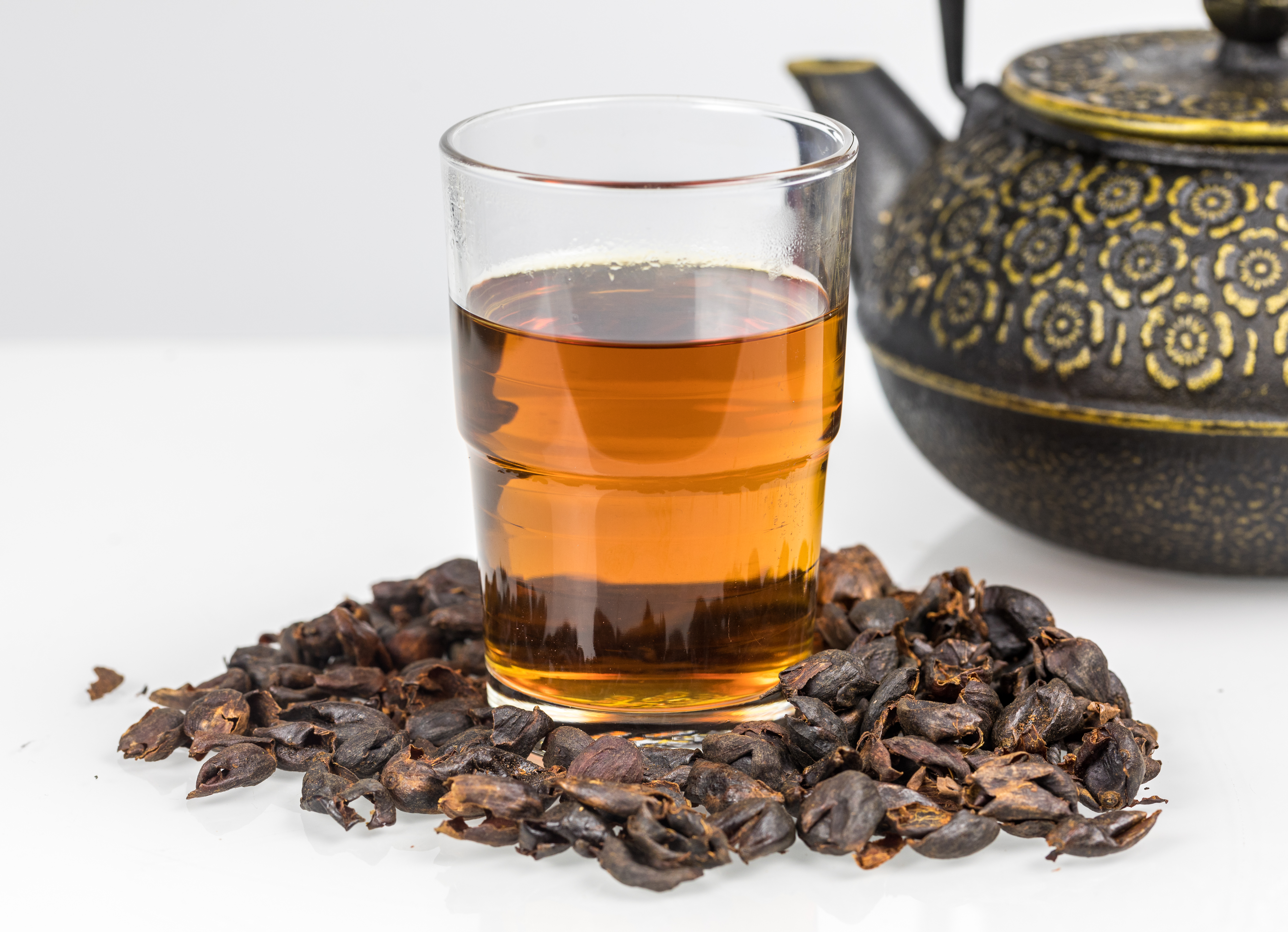
Coffee cherry tea

Coffee cherry tea is an herbal tea made from the dried skins and/or pulp of the fruit of the coffee plant that remain after the coffee beans have been collected from within. It is also known as cascara, from the Spanish cáscara, meaning "husk" not to be confused with the Frangula purshiana plant of the same name. It is originally from Yemen and Ethiopia. Starting about 2005 it was independently developed and promoted for export by Salvadoran coffee farmer Aida Batlle. The dried whole fruits are also eaten like raisins.

== History ==
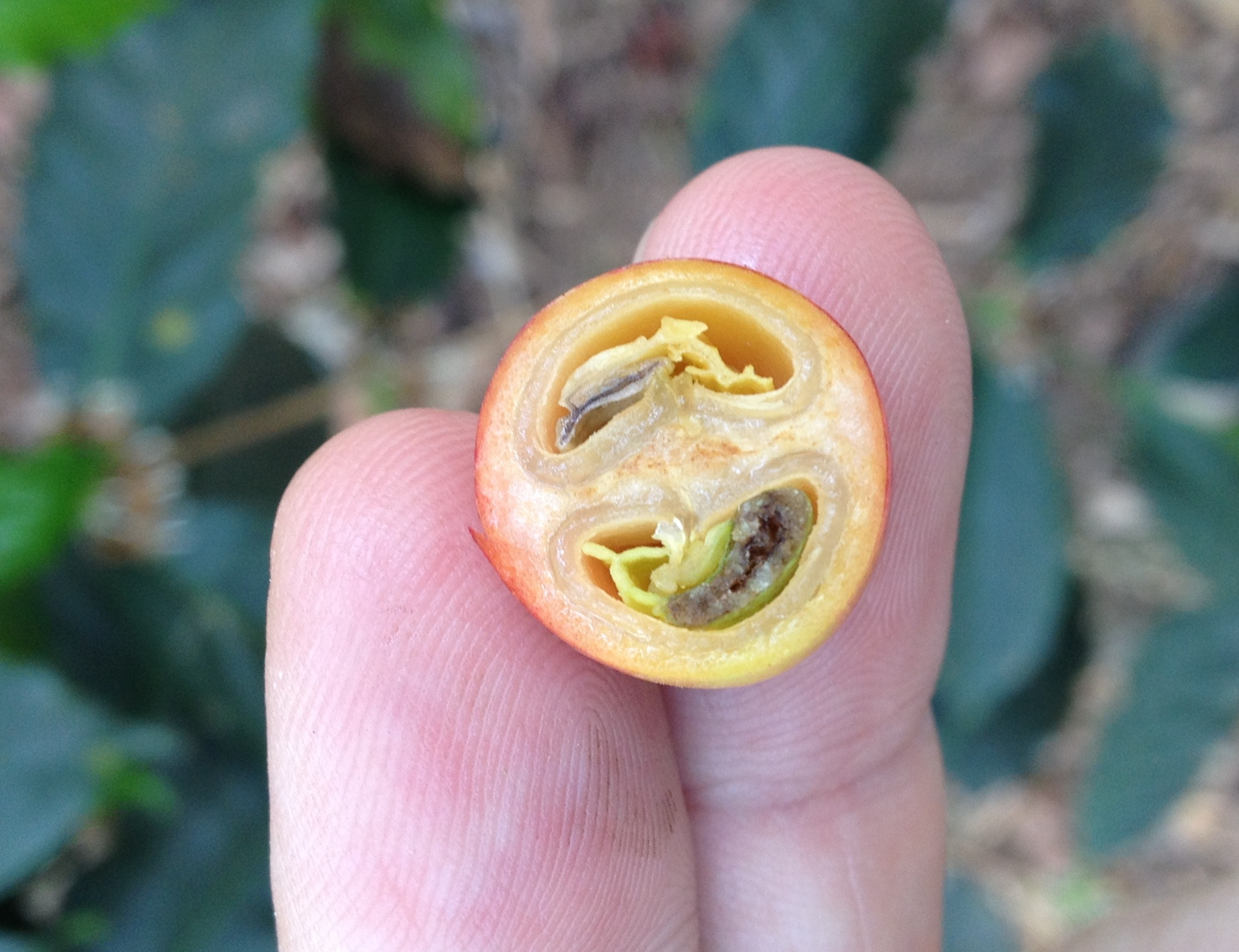
Coffee beans inside the coffee fruit

Hashara and qishr are similar drinks traditional in Ethiopia and Yemen. It is believed that cáscara tea was consumed in Yemen even before the form of coffee we know today. Outside of these traditional uses, in most coffee-producing countries the coffee fruit is usually considered a wasted byproduct of the coffee-production process.

Independently of this traditional beverage, Salvadoran coffee farmer Aida Batlle developed a secondary market for coffee cherry skins, which are dried to create a tea she called cascara. Around 2005 she noticed the coffee cherry husks, which are commonly discarded in the milling process, had a floral aroma, and she decided to try brewing tea from them. Cascara in Spanish means skin or peel of fruit. By 2009 it was being offered as a beverage in US coffee shops. Other growers also began selling their coffee cherry pulp and skins as teas.

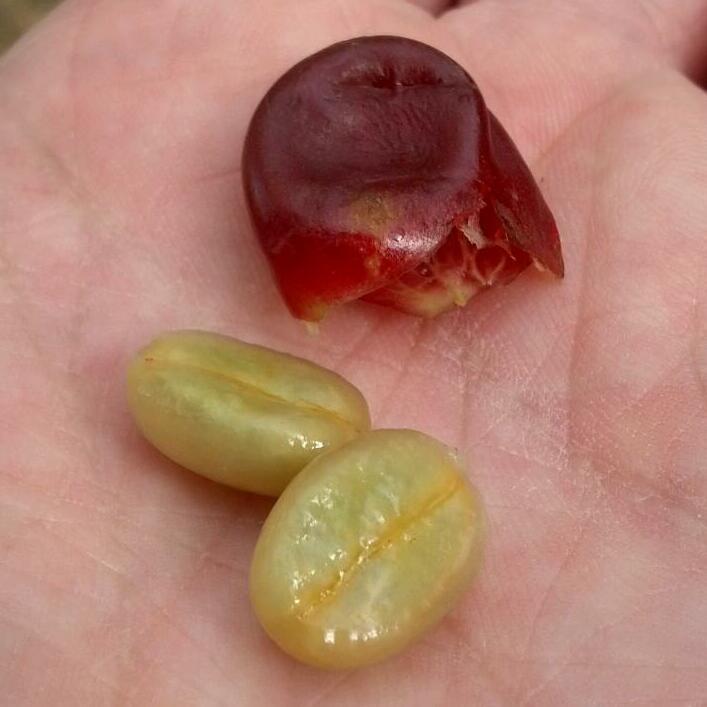
After the coffee beans are collected, the remaining fruit is sundried and brewed into coffee cherry tea.

Increasing demand for cáscara from large U.S.-based coffee chains has, in some cases, led to the dried husks fetching higher prices than the coffee beans.

== Brewing ==
The husks can be dried and flaked like ground tea or dried into raisinlike pieces, both of which are prepared by steeping in hot water for a short period or cold water for a lengthy period. The resulting beverage is served hot, iced, carbonated, and bottled by various producers, including as a beer. Typical proportions call for steeping three tablespoons of dried flaked cascara in 10 to 12 ounces (300 to 350 mL) of hot water for four minutes or cold water for 12 to 16 hours.

== Health benefits ==
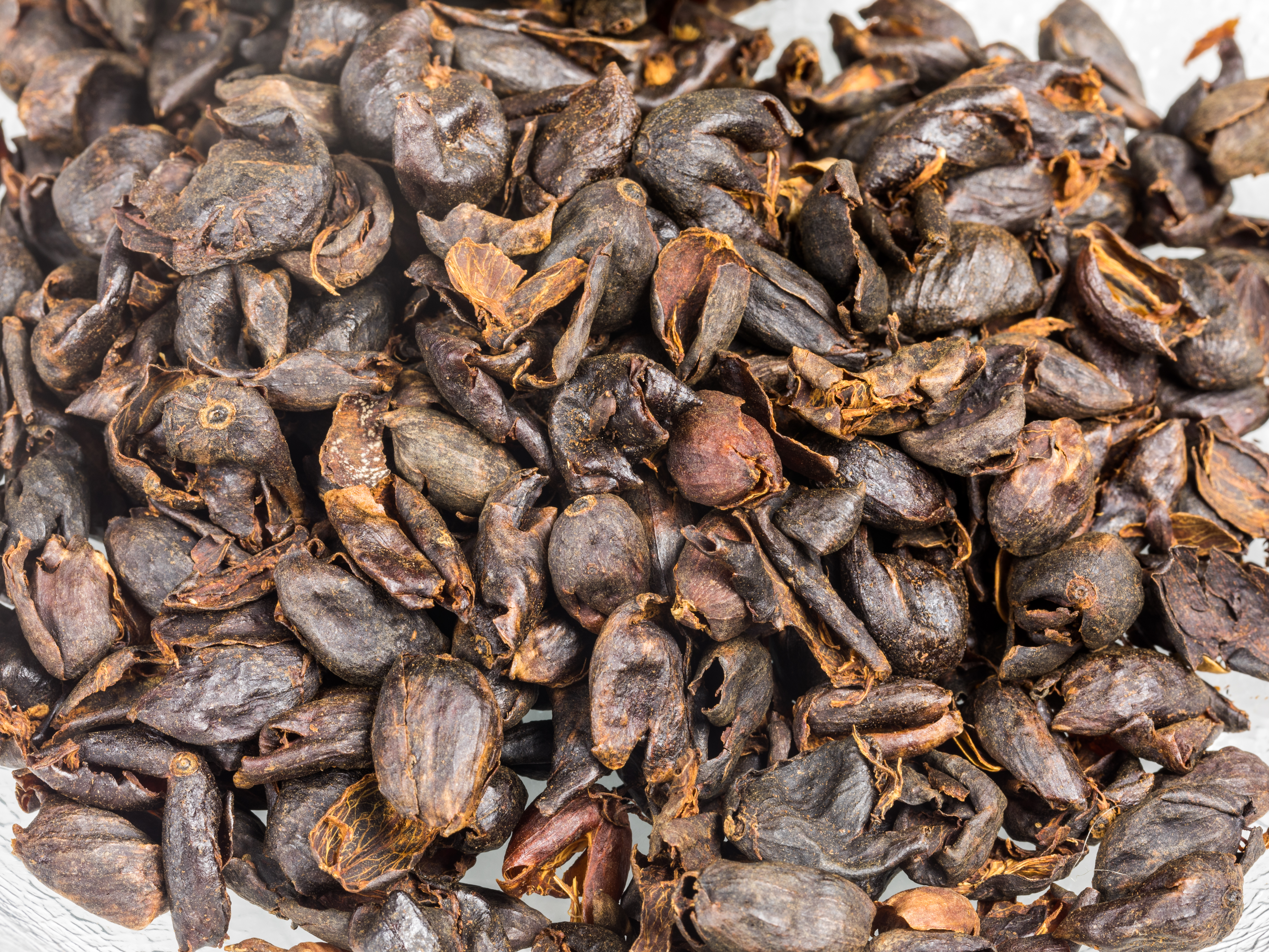
Dried coffee cherry

A study published in the Cambridge University Press showed evidence that extracts derived from coffee fruit increase BDNF (brain-derived neurotrophic factor) in healthy subjects, likely due to its high polyphenol content, though this was a small study involving 25 subjects and the authors note larger clinical studies are needed. A systemic research review demonstrated that polyphenol consumption may increase cognition both acutely and chronically, though comparisons between studies are hampered by methodological inconsistencies.

Coffee fruit contains caffeine. Caffeine has possible neuro-protective properties, including a possible prevention or reduction in rate of progression of dementia. Caffeine levels in cascara are similar to those found in black teas.

In 2022, the European Food Safety Authority (EFSA) concluded that dried coffee husk (cascara) from Coffea arabica is safe for its proposed uses as a novel food under specified conditions of use and intake levels.

== Forms ==
It is served hot, iced, carbonated, and bottled by various producers, including in addition to a tea as a soda, a beer, a liqueur, and a flavored vodka.

The dried whole fruit is also eaten like raisins. Coffee cherry tea is also sold as ready-to-drink beverages, syrups, and concentrated extracts, reflecting the increasing commercial use of coffee fruit by-products in food and beverage products.

It is also ground into a flour which can be used by those avoiding gluten.

Coffee cherry flour has also been incorporated into baked goods and other food products as a means of utilising coffee-processing by-products while reducing food waste.

== Description ==
The tea is described as fruity and floral; the fruits are described as not dissimilar to other dried fruits such as apricots, cranberries, and raisins, and the flour has a fruity flavor.

== See also ==
- Coffee-leaf tea
