= Qishr =

Yemeni hot drink

Qishr (Arabic: قشر geshir, gishr, kishr) is a Yemeni traditional hot drink made of spiced coffee husks, ginger, and sometimes cinnamon. In Yemen, it is usually drunk as an alternative to coffee because it does not need to be roasted.

== History ==
Coffee arrived in Yemen from across the Red Sea into the Arabian Peninsula into the region that is now Yemen, where Muslim dervishes began cultivating the shrub in their gardens. At first, Yemenis made wine from the pulp of the fermented coffee berries. This beverage was known as qishr and was used during religious ceremonies.

"Ginger coffee is the universal drink and the cup is always filled, a guest being given two cups at once... Qishr, an infusion made from the husks of coffee berries, is also drunk, particularly in the Tihamat al 'Asir."

Concerning qishr, "Great hospitality was shown to us on entering their houses; we were always pressed to stay, and never allowed to go without taking a cup of coffee or rather an infusion of coffee husk called 'keshr'; for, strange to say, though in the heart of the coffee country, coffee is never taken as a beverage."

== See also ==
- Coffea arabica
- Coffee cherry tea

== Bibliography ==
- Philby, H. St. J. B. (Harry St. John Bridger), 1885–1960. Arabian Highlands. Ithaca: Published for the Middle East Institute, Washington, D.C. [by] Cornell University Press, [1952]. Subjects: Arabian Peninsula—Description and travel. 771 p. : illus., maps (part fold., 1 in pocket). OCLC No.: 01083943. Page 687.
