= List of Aspergillus species =

List of fungus species in the genus Aspergillus.

== Species ==
The genus Aspergillus includes several hundred fungus species. As of August 2023, there are 817 different combinations including synonyms as acknowledged by Species Fungorum, representing 592 accepted species; In the list below, if no author/authors (or published date) mentioned then it is not listed in Species Fungorum.

=== A ===
- Aspergillus acidohumus A.J. Chen, Frisvad & Samson (2016)
- Aspergillus acidus Kozak. (1989)
- Aspergillus acolumnaris Varshney & A.K. Sarbhoy (1981)
- Aspergillus acrensis Hubka, A. Nováková, Yaguchi, Matsuz. & Y. Horie (2018)
- Aspergillus aculeatinus Noonim, Frisvad, Varga & Samson (2008)
- Aspergillus aculeatus Iizuka (1953)
- Aspergillus acutus Blaser (1976)
- Aspergillus aeneus Sappa (1954)
- Aspergillus aerius Juan Chen, Frisvad & Samson (2016)
- Aspergillus affinis Davolos, Persiani, Pietr. & Maggi (2011)
- Aspergillus aflatoxiformans Frisvad, Ezekiel, Samson & Houbraken (2018)
- Aspergillus agricola Pummi Singh, K.A. Callicott, M.J. Orbach & P.J. Cotty (2020)
- Aspergillus alabamensis Balajee, Baddley, Frisvad & Samson (2009)
- Aspergillus albertensis J.P. Tewari (1985)
- Aspergillus alboluteus F. Sklenar, Jurjević, Ezekiel, Houbraken & Hubka (2021)
- Aspergillus alboviridis J.P.Z. Siqueira, Gené, F. Sklenar & Hubka (2021)
- Aspergillus allahabadii B.S. Mehrotra & Agnihotri (1963)
- Aspergillus alliaceus Thom & Church (1945)
- Aspergillus allocotus Bat. & H. Maia (1957)
- Aspergillus alutaceus Berk. & M.A. Curtis (1875)
- Aspergillus amazonensis (Henn.) Samson & Seifert (1986)
- Aspergillus amazonicus D.Mares (2008)
- Aspergillus ambiguus Sappa (1955)
- Aspergillus amethystinus F. Sklenar, S.W. Peterson & Hubka (2020)
- Aspergillus amoenus
- Aspergillus amstelodami (L. Mangin) Thom & Church (1926)
- Aspergillus amyloliquefaciens
- Aspergillus amylovorus Panas. ex Samson (1979)
- Aspergillus angustatus A.J. Chen, Frisvad & Samson (2016)
- Aspergillus anomalus Mosseray (1934)
- Aspergillus anthodesmis Bartoli & Maggi (1979)
- Aspergillus apicalis B.S. Mehrotra & Basu (1976)
- Aspergillus appendiculatus Blaser (1976)
- Aspergillus arachidicola Pildain, Frisvad & Samson (2008)
- Aspergillus arcoverdensis Y. Horie, Matsuzawa, Yaguchi & Camp.-Tak. (2014)
- Aspergillus ardalensis A. Nováková, Hubka, S.W. Peterson & M. Kolařík (2015)
- Aspergillus arenarioides Visagie, Hirooka & Samson (2014)
- Aspergillus arenarius Raper & Fennell (1965)
- Aspergillus argenteus J.N. Rai & H.J. Chowdhery (1980)
- Aspergillus aridicola H.Z. Kong & Z.T. Qi (1995)
- Aspergillus arizonicus Jurjević, Glässnerová, Yaguchi & Hubka (2021)
- Aspergillus arxii (Fort & Guarro) Houbraken, Visagie & Samson (2014)
- Aspergillus asclerogenus Jurjević & Hubka (2015)
- Aspergillus askiburgiensis A. Nováková, Hubka, Frisvad, S.W. Peterson & M. Kolařík (2016)
- Aspergillus aspearensis Houbraken, Frisvad, Arzanlou & Samson (2018)
- Aspergillus asper Jurjević & S.W. Peterson (2016)
- Aspergillus asperescens Stolk (1954)
- Aspergillus assiutensis Moub. & Soliman (2011)
- Aspergillus assulatus (S.B. Hong, Frisvad & Samson) Houbraken, Visagie & Samson (2014)
- Aspergillus astellatus (Fennell & Raper) Houbraken, Visagie & Samson (2014)
- Aspergillus atacamensis Zalar, Azúa-Bustos & Gunde-Cim. (2017)
- Aspergillus atheciellus Samson & W. Gams (1986)
- Aspergillus athecius Raper & Fennell (1965)
- Aspergillus attinii J. Lehm. (1974)
- Aspergillus aurantiacoflavus Hubka, A.J. Chen, Jurjević & Samson (2017)
- Aspergillus aurantiobrunneus Raper & Fennell (1965)
- Aspergillus aurantiopurpureus A.J. Chen, Frisvad & Samson (2016)
- Aspergillus auratus Warcup (1965)
- Aspergillus aureofulgens Luppi Mosca (1973)
- Aspergillus aureolatus Munt.-Cvetk. & Bata (1964)
- Aspergillus aureolus Fennell & Raper (1955)
- Aspergillus aureoluteus Samson & W. Gams (1986)
- Aspergillus aureoterreus Samson, S.W. Peterson, Frisvad & Varga (2011)
- Aspergillus aureus
- Aspergillus auricomus (Guég.) Saito (1939)
- Aspergillus australensis (Samson, S.B. Hong & Varga) Houbraken, Visagie & Samson (2014)
- Aspergillus austroafricanus Juridic, S.W. Peterson & B.W. Horn (2012)
- Aspergillus austwickii Frisvad, Ezekiel, Samson & Houbraken (2018)
- Aspergillus avenaceus G. Sm. (1943)
- Aspergillus awamori Nakaz. (1907)

=== B ===
- Aspergillus baarnensis Samson, Visagie & Houbraken (2014)
- Aspergillus baeticus A. Nováková & Hubka (2012)
- Aspergillus bahamensis
- Aspergillus banksianus Pitt (2020)
- Aspergillus barbosae A.C.R. Barros-Correia, R.N. Barbosa, Houbraken & Souza-Motta (2020)
- Aspergillus batatas Saito (1907)
- Aspergillus beijingensis D.M. Li, Y. Horie, Yu X. Wang & R.Y. Li (1998)
- Aspergillus bertholletius Taniwaki, Pitt & Frisvad (2012)
- Aspergillus bezerrae J.P. Andrade, C.N. Figueiredo, H.G. de Souza, J.T. De Souza & P.A.S. Marbach (2019)
- Aspergillus bicephalus J.P.Z. Siqueira, Gené & Guarro (2016)
- Aspergillus bicolor M. Chr. & States (1978)
- Aspergillus biplanus Raper & Fennell (1965)
- Aspergillus bisporus Kwon-Chung & Fennell (1971)
- Aspergillus bombycis S.W. Peterson, Yoko Ito, B.W. Horn & T. Goto (2001)
- Aspergillus botswanensis A.J. Chen, Frisvad & Samson (2016)
- Aspergillus botucatensis Y. Horie, Miyaji & Nishim. (1995)
- Aspergillus brasiliensis Varga, Frisvad & Samson (2007)
- Aspergillus brevijanus S.W. Peterson (2008)
- Aspergillus brevipes G. Sm. (1952)
- Aspergillus brevistipitatus A. Nováková & Hubka (2013)
- Aspergillus bridgeri M. Chr. (1982)
- Aspergillus brunneo-uniseriatus Suj. Singh & B.K. Bakshi (1961)
- Aspergillus brunneus
- Aspergillus brunneoviolaceus Bat. & H. Maia (1955)
- Aspergillus burnettii Pitt (2020)

=== C ===
- Aspergillus caatingaensis Y. Horie, Matsuz., Yaguchi & Y. Takaki (2014)
- Aspergillus caelatus B.W. Horn (1997)
- Aspergillus caesiellus Saito (1904)
- Aspergillus caespitosus Raper & Thom (1944)
- Aspergillus calidoustus Varga, Houbraken & Samson (2008)
- Aspergillus californicus Frisian, Varga & Samson (2011)
- Aspergillus campestris M. Chr. (1982)
- Aspergillus canadensis Visagie, N. Yilmaz, F. Sklenář & Seifert (2017)
- Aspergillus candidus Link (1809)
- Aspergillus caninus (Sigler, Deanna A. Sutton, Gibas, Summerb. & Iwen) Houbraken, Tanney, Visagie & Samson (2014)
- Aspergillus capensis Visagie, Hirooka & Samson (2014)
- Aspergillus caperatus Juan Chen, Frisvad & Samson (2017)
- Aspergillus capsici
- Aspergillus carbonarius (Bainier) Thom (1916)
- Aspergillus carlsbadensis Frisvad, Varga & Samson (2011)
- Aspergillus carneus Blochwitz (1933)
- Aspergillus carlsbadensis
- Aspergillus cavernicola Lörinczi (1969)
- Aspergillus cejpii (Milko) Samson, Varga, Visagie & Houbraken (2014)
- Aspergillus cellulosae Ellenberger (1916)
- Aspergillus cerealis Houbraken, Frisvad, Ezekiel & Samson (2018)
- Aspergillus cervinus Massee (1914)
- Aspergillus chaetosartoryae Hubka, Kocsubé & Houbraken (2020)
- Aspergillus chevalieri (L. Mangin) Thom & Church (1926)
- Aspergillus chinensis Samson, Visagie & Houbraken (2014)
- Aspergillus chlamydosporus (Gené & Guarro) Houbraken, Tanney, Visagie & Samson (2014)
- Aspergillus christenseniae A.J. Chen, Frisvad & Samson (2016)
- Aspergillus chryseides Samson & W. Gams (1986)
- Aspergillus chrysellus Kwon-Chung & Fennell (1965)
- Aspergillus chungii
- Aspergillus cibarius S.B. Hong & Samson (2012)
- Aspergillus citocrescens Hubka, A. Nováková & M. Kolařík (2015)
- Aspergillus citrinoterreus J. Guinea, Sand.-Den., Escribano, Bouza & Guarro (2015)
- Aspergillus citrisporus Höhn. (1902)
- Aspergillus clavatoflavus
- Aspergillus clavatonanicus Bat., H. Maia & Alecrim (1955)
- Aspergillus clavatophorus F. Sklenář, S.W. Peterson & Hubka (2017)
- Aspergillus clavatus Desm. (1834)
- Aspergillus cleistominutus
- Aspergillus collembolorum Dörfelt & A.R. Schmidt (2005)
- Aspergillus collinsii Jurjević & S.W. Peterson (2016)
- Aspergillus coloradensis F. Sklenar, Jurjević & Hubka (2020)
- Aspergillus compatibilis Samson & W. Gams (1986)
- Aspergillus conicus Blochwitz (1914)
- Aspergillus conjunctus Kwon-Chung & Fennell (1965)
- Aspergillus contaminans Hubka, Jurjević, S.W. Peterson & Lysková (2017)
- Aspergillus conversis Hubka & A. Nováková (2013)
- Aspergillus coreanus S.B. Hong, Frisvad & Samson (2006)
- Aspergillus coremiiformis Bartoli & Maggi (1979)
- Aspergillus corolligenus (Massee) Subram. (1971)
- Aspergillus corrugatus Udagawa & Y. Horie (1976)
- Aspergillus costaricensis Samson & Frisvad (2004)
- Aspergillus costiformis H.Z. Kong & Z.T. Qi (1995)
- Aspergillus crassihyphae Wadhwani & N. Mehrotra (1985)
- Aspergillus creber Jurjević, S.W. Peterson & B.W. Horn (2012)
- Aspergillus cremeoflavus Samson & W. Gams (1986)
- Aspergillus cremeus Kwon-Chung & Fennell (1965)
- Aspergillus cretensis Frisvad & Samson (2004)
- Aspergillus cristatellus Kozak. (1989)
- Aspergillus cristatus Raper & Fennell (1965)
- Aspergillus croceiaffinis F. Sklenar, Jurjević & Hubka (2020)
- Aspergillus croceus Hubka, A. Nováková, Frisvad, S.W. Peterson & M. Kolařík (2016)
- Aspergillus crustosus Raper & Fennell (1965)
- Aspergillus crystallinus
- Aspergillus cumulatus D.Han Kim & S.B. Hong (2014)
- Aspergillus curvatus Al-Bedak & Moubasher (2020)
- Aspergillus curviformis H.J. Chowdhery & J.N. Rai (1980)
- Aspergillus cvjetkovicii Jurjević, S.W. Peterson & B.W. Horn (2012)

=== D ===
- Aspergillus deflectus Fennell & Raper (1955)
- Aspergillus delacroixii
- Aspergillus delicatus H.Z. Kong (1997)
- Aspergillus densus
- Aspergillus dentatulus
- Aspergillus denticulatus (Samson, S.B. Hong & Frisvad) Samson, S.B. Hong, Visagie & Houbraken (2014)
- Aspergillus depauperatus
- Aspergillus desertorum (Samson & Mouch.) Samson, Visagie & Houbraken (2014)
- Aspergillus dessyi
- Aspergillus destruens Zalar, F. Sklenář, S.W. Peterson & Hubka (2017)
- Aspergillus digitatus
- Aspergillus dimorphicus B.S. Mehrotra & R. Prasad (1969)
- Aspergillus diplocystis
- Aspergillus dipodomyus F. Sklenar, Jurjević & Hubka (2020)
- Aspergillus discophorus Samson, Zalar & Frisvad (2008)
- Aspergillus disjunctus
- Aspergillus diversus Raper & Fennell (1965)
- Aspergillus dobrogensis A. Nováková, Jurjević, Sklenar, Frisvad, Houbraken & Hubka (2018)
- Aspergillus domesticus F. Sklenář, Houbraken, Zalar & Hubka (2017)
- Aspergillus dorothicus
- Aspergillus dromiae A.J. Chen (2016)
- Aspergillus dubius Corda (1838)
- Aspergillus duricaulis
- Aspergillus dybowskii (Pat.) Samson & Seifert (1986)

=== E ===
- Aspergillus eburneocremeus Sappa (1954)
- Aspergillus eburneus
- Aspergillus echinosporus
- Aspergillus echinulatus Thom & Church (1926)
- Aspergillus ecuadorensis
- Aspergillus effusus
- Aspergillus egyptiacus Moub. & Moustafa (1972)
- Aspergillus elatior
- Aspergillus elegans Gasperini (1887)
- Aspergillus ellipsoideus J.N. Rai & H.J. Chowdhery (1980)
- Aspergillus ellipticus Raper & Fennell (1965)
- Aspergillus elongatus J.N. Rai & S.C. Agarwal (1970)
- Aspergillus elsenburgensis Visagie, S.M. Romero & Houbraken (2020)
- Aspergillus endophyticus Hubka, A.J. Chen & Samson (2017)
- Aspergillus equitis Samson & W. Gams (1986)
- Aspergillus erythrocephalus Berk. & M.A. Curtis (1868)
- Aspergillus eucalypticola Varga, Frisvad & Samson (2011)
- Aspergillus europaeus Hubka, A. Nováková, Samson, Houbraken, Frisvad & M. Kolařík (2016)

=== F ===
- Aspergillus falconensis Y. Horie, Miyaji, Nishim. & Udagawa (1989)
- Aspergillus fasciculatus
- Aspergillus felis Barrs, van Doorn, Varga & Samson (2013)
- Aspergillus fennelliae Kwon-Chung & S.J. Kim (1974)
- Aspergillus ferenczii (Varga & Samson) Samson, Varga, Visagie & Houbraken (2014)
- Aspergillus ferrugineus
- Aspergillus ficuum (Reichardt) Thom & Currie (1916)
- Aspergillus fiemonthi
- Aspergillus fijiensis Varga, Frisvad & Samson (2011)
- Aspergillus filifer Zalar, Frisvad & Samson (2008)
- Aspergillus fimetarius
- Aspergillus fimeti
- Aspergillus fimicola H.Z. Kong & Z.T. Qi (1995)
- Aspergillus fischeri Wehmer (1907)
- Aspergillus fischerianus Samson & W. Gams (1986)
- Aspergillus flaschentraegeri Stolk (1964)
- Aspergillus flavescens
- Aspergillus flavidus
- Aspergillus flavipes (Bainier & R. Sartory) Thom & Church (1926)
- Aspergillus flavofurcatus Bat. & H. Maia (1955)
- Aspergillus flavoviridescens
- Aspergillus flavus Link (1809)
- Aspergillus floccosus (Y.K. Shih) Samson, S.W. Peterson, Frisvad & Varga (2011)
- Aspergillus flocculosus Frisvad & Samson (2004)
- Aspergillus floridensis Jurjević, G. Perrone & S.W. Peterson (2012)
- Aspergillus floriformis Samson & Mouch. (1975)
- Aspergillus foeniculicola Udagawa (1979)
- Aspergillus foetidus Thom & Raper (1945)
- Aspergillus fonsecaeus Thom & Raper (1945)
- Aspergillus foutoynontii
- Aspergillus foveolatus Y. Horie (1978)
- Aspergillus frankstonensis Barrs, Talbot & Houbraken (2017)
- Aspergillus frequens Hubka, A. Nováková, M. Kolařík & S.W. Peterson (2015)
- Aspergillus fresenii Subram. (1971)
- Aspergillus fructus Jurjević, S.W. Peterson & B.W. Horn (2012)
- Aspergillus fruticans Samson & W. Gams (1986)
- Aspergillus fruticulosus Raper & Fennell (1965)
- Aspergillus fujiokensis Sugiy. (1967)
- Aspergillus fuliginosus
- Aspergillus fulvus
- Aspergillus fumaricus
- Aspergillus fumigatiaffinis S.B. Hong, Frisvad & Samson (2006)
- Aspergillus fumigatoides
- Aspergillus fumigatus Fresen. (1863)
- Aspergillus fumisynnematus Y. Horie, Miyaji, Nishim., Taguchi & Udagawa (1993)
- Aspergillus fungoides
- Aspergillus funiculosus G. Sm. (1956)
- Aspergillus fuscicans S.M. Romero, A.I. Romero, V.A. Barrera & Comerio (2018)
- Aspergillus fuscus

=== G ===
- Aspergillus gaarensis Al-Bedak & Moubasher (2020)
- Aspergillus galapagensis (Frisvad, S.B. Hong & Samson) Samson, Frisvad & Houbraken (2014)
- Aspergillus galeritus
- Aspergillus germanicus Varga, Frisvad & Samson (2011)
- Aspergillus giganteus Wehmer (1901)
- Aspergillus gigantosulphureus
- Aspergillus gigas
- Aspergillus glaber Blaser (1976)
- Aspergillus glabripes F. Sklenář, Jurjević & Hubka (2017)
- Aspergillus glaucoaffinis Samson & W. Gams (1986)
- Aspergillus glauconiveus Samson & W. Gams (1986)
- Aspergillus glaucus (L.) Link (1809)
- Aspergillus globosus
- Aspergillus godfrini
- Aspergillus gorakhpurensis Kamal & Bhargava (1969)
- Aspergillus gracilis Bainier (1907)
- Aspergillus granulatus Mosseray (1934)
- Aspergillus granulosus Raper & Thom (1944)
- Aspergillus gratioti
- Aspergillus greconis
- Aspergillus griseoaurantiacus Visagie, Hirooka & Samson (2014)
- Aspergillus griseus Link (1824)
- Aspergillus guttifer
- Aspergillus gymnosardae Yukawa (1911)

=== H ===
- Aspergillus hainanicus X.C. Wang & W.Y. Zhuang (2022)
- Aspergillus haitiensis Varga, Frisvad & Samson (2010)
- Aspergillus halophilicus
- Aspergillus halophilus
- Aspergillus hancockii Pitt (2017)
- Aspergillus heldtiae Visagie (2020)
- Aspergillus helicothrix Al-Musallam (1980)
- Aspergillus hennebergii Blochwitz (1935)
- Aspergillus herbariorum
- Aspergillus heterocaryoticus C.M. Chr., L.C. López & C.R. Benj. (1965)
- Aspergillus heteromorphus Bat. & H. Maia (1957)
- Aspergillus heterothallicus
- Aspergillus heyangensis Z.T. Qi, Z.M. Sun & Yu X. Wang (1994)
- Aspergillus hiratsukae Udagawa, Tsub. & Y. Horie (1991)
- Aspergillus hollandicus Samson & W. Gams (1986)
- Aspergillus homomorphus Steiman, Guiraud, Sage & Seigle-Mur. ex Samson & Frisvad (2004)
- Aspergillus hongkongensis C.C. Tsang et al, (2016)
- Aspergillus hordei F. Sklenář, S.W. Peterson & Hubka (2017)
- Aspergillus hortae
- Aspergillus hortai
- Aspergillus huiyaniae Y. Horie, Matsuz., Abliz & Yaguchi (2014)
- Aspergillus humicola Chaudhuri & Sachar (1934)
- Aspergillus humus
- Aspergillus hydei Doilom (2020)

=== I ===
- Aspergillus ibericus R. Serra, J. Cabañes & G. Perrone (2006)
- Aspergillus igneus Kozak. (1989)
- Aspergillus iizukae Sugiy. (1967)
- Aspergillus implicatus Persiani & Maggi (1994)
- Aspergillus incahuasiensis E. Piontelli, P. Vieille & S.W. Peterson (2019)
- Aspergillus incrassatus
- Aspergillus indicus
- Aspergillus indohii Y. Horie (2003)
- Aspergillus indologenus Varga, Frisvad & Samson (2011)
- Aspergillus inflatus (Stolk & Malla) Samson, Frisvad, Varga, Visagie & Houbraken (2014)
- Aspergillus infrequens F. Sklenář, S.W. Peterson & Hubka (2017)
- Aspergillus ingratus Yaguchi, Someya & Udagawa (1993)
- Aspergillus insecticola Subram. (1971)
- Aspergillus insolitus (G. Sm.) Houbraken, Visagie & Samson (2014)
- Aspergillus insuetus (Bainier) Thom & Church (1929)
- Aspergillus insulicola Montem. & A.R. Santiago (1975)
- Aspergillus intermedius Blaser (1976)
- Aspergillus inuii Sakag., Iizuka & M. Yamaz. (1950)
- Aspergillus inusitatus F. Sklenar, C. Silva Pereira, Houbraken & Hubka (2021)
- Aspergillus iranicus Arzanlou, Houbraken & Samadi (2016)
- Aspergillus israelensis A.J. Chen, Frisvad & Samson (2016)
- Aspergillus itaconicus Kinosh. (1931)
- Aspergillus ivoriensis Bartoli & Maggi (1979)

=== J ===
- Aspergillus jaipurensis Samson, Visagie & Houbraken (2014)
- Aspergillus janus Raper & Thom (1944)
- Aspergillus japonicus Saito (1906)
- Aspergillus jeanselmei M. Ota (1923)
- Aspergillus jensenii Jurjević, S.W. Peterson & B.W. Horn (2012)
- Aspergillus jilinensis X.Z. Jiang (2020)

=== K ===
- Aspergillus kalimae Tanney, Visagie & Seifert (2017)
- Aspergillus kambarensis Sugiy. (1967)
- Aspergillus kanagawaensis Nehira (1951)
- Aspergillus karnatakaensis Varga, Frisvad & Samson (2010)
- Aspergillus kassunensis Baghd. (1968)
- Aspergillus keratitidis (Wei L. Chen, Y.M. Ju, H.M. Hsieh, H.Y. Lin & F.R. Hu) Zalar & Wei L. Chen (2017)
- Aspergillus katsuobushi
- Aspergillus keveii Varga, Frisvad & Samson (2007)
- Aspergillus keveioides L. Wang (2013)
- Aspergillus koningii Oudem. (1902)
- Aspergillus koreanus Hyang B. Lee, T.T. Duong & T.T. Nguyen (2016)
- Aspergillus krugeri Visagie (2020)
- Aspergillus kumbius Pitt (2020)

=== L ===
- Aspergillus labruscus Fungaro, Sartori, Ferranti, Frisvad, Taniwaki & Iamanaka (2017)
- Aspergillus laciniosus S.B. Hong, Frisvad & Samson (2006)
- Aspergillus lacticoffeatus Frisvad & Samson (2004)
- Aspergillus lannaensis Suwannar., S. Khuna & Lumyong (2021)
- Aspergillus laneus
- Aspergillus lanosus Kamal & Bhargava (1969)
- Aspergillus lanuginosus F. Sklenar & Hubka (2021)
- Aspergillus laokiashanensis
- Aspergillus lateralis
- Aspergillus latilabiatus A.J. Chen, Frisvad & Samson (2016)
- Aspergillus latus (Thom & Raper) A.J. Chen, Frisvad & Samson (2016)
- Aspergillus lentulus Balajee & K.A. Marr (2005)
- Aspergillus lepidophyton
- Aspergillus leporis States & M. Chr. (1966)
- Aspergillus leucocarpus Hadlok & Stolk (1969)
- Aspergillus levisporus Hubka, A.J. Chen, Jurjević & Samson (2017)
- Aspergillus lignieresii
- Aspergillus limoniformis Z.F. Zhang & L. Cai (2020)
- Aspergillus longistipitatus F. Sklenar, Jurjević & Hubka (2020)
- Aspergillus longivesica L.H. Huang & Raper (1971)
- Aspergillus longobasidia
- Aspergillus loretoensis S. González-Martinez & A. Portillo-López (2019)
- Aspergillus luchensi
- Aspergillus luchuensis
- Aspergillus lucknowensis J.N. Rai, J.P. Tewari & S.C. Agarwal (1968)
- Aspergillus luppii Hubka, A. Nováková, M. Kolařík & S.W. Peterson (2015)
- Aspergillus luteoniger
- Aspergillus luteorubrus Pitt (2020)
- Aspergillus luteovirescens
- Aspergillus lutescens
- Aspergillus luteus

=== M ===
- Aspergillus macfiei
- Aspergillus macrosporus
- Aspergillus magaliesburgensis Visagie (2020)
- Aspergillus magnivesiculatus F. Sklenář, Zalar, Jurjević & Hubka (2017)
- Aspergillus malignus Gedoelst ex Lindt (1889)
- Aspergillus mallochii C.M. Visagie, N. Yilmaz & Seifert (2017)
- Aspergillus malodoratus
- Aspergillus malvaceus
- Aspergillus malvicolor A.D. Hocking (2020)
- Aspergillus mandshuricus
- Aspergillus mangaliensis A. Nováková, Hubka, S.W. Peterson & M. Kolařík (2015)
- Aspergillus manginii Thom & Raper (1945)
- Aspergillus mannitosus
- Aspergillus maritimus Samson & W. Gams (1986)
- Aspergillus marvanovae Hubka, S.W. Peterson, Frisvad & M. Kolařík (2013)
- Aspergillus mattletii
- Aspergillus maximus
- Aspergillus medius R. Meissn. (1897)
- Aspergillus megasporus C.M. Visagie, N. Yilmaz & Seifert (2017)
- Aspergillus melitensis
- Aspergillus melleus Yukawa (1911)
- Aspergillus mellinus Novobr. (1972)
- Aspergillus mencieri
- Aspergillus michelii
- Aspergillus microcephalus Mosseray (1934)
- Aspergillus microcysticus Sappa (1955)
- Aspergillus micronesiensis Visagie, Hirooka & Samson (2014)
- Aspergillus microperforatus J.P.Z. Siqueira, Deanna A. Sutton & J. Gené (2017)
- Aspergillus microsporus
- Aspergillus microthecius Samson & W. Gams (1986)
- Aspergillus microviridicitrinus
- Aspergillus minimus Wehmer (1899)
- Aspergillus minisclerotigenes Vaamonde, Frisvad & Samson (2008)
- Aspergillus minor
- Aspergillus minutus
- Aspergillus miraensis (L.C. Zhang, Juan Chen & S.X. Guo) Hubka, S.W. Peterson & M. Kolařík (2016)
- Aspergillus miyajii Y. Horie (1997)
- Aspergillus miyakoensis
- Aspergillus mollis
- Aspergillus monodii (Locq.-Lin.) Varga, Frisvad & Samson (2011)
- Aspergillus montenegroi Y. Horie, Miyaji & Nishim. (1996)
- Aspergillus montevidensis Talice & J.A. Mackinnon (1931)
- Aspergillus montoensis Y.P. Tan, Bishop-Hurley, S.M. Thompson & R.G. Shivas (2021)
- Aspergillus mottae Soares, P. Rodrigues, S.W. Peterson, N. Lima & Venâncio (2012)
- Aspergillus movilensis A. Nováková, Hubka, S.W. Peterson & M. Kolařík (2015)
- Aspergillus mucoroides
- Aspergillus mucoroideus
- Aspergillus muelleri
- Aspergillus multicolor Sappa (1954)
- Aspergillus multiplicatus Yaguchi, Someya & Udagawa (1994)
- Aspergillus mulundensis Bills & Frisvad (2016)
- Aspergillus muricatus Udagawa, Uchiy. & Kamiya (1994)
- Aspergillus muscivora
- Aspergillus mutabilis Bainier & Sartory (1911)
- Aspergillus mycetomi-villabruzzii
- Aspergillus mycobanche

=== N ===
- Aspergillus nakazawae Sakag., Iizuka & M. Yamaz. (1950)
- Aspergillus nanangensis Pitt (2020)
- Aspergillus nantae
- Aspergillus nanus
- Aspergillus navahoensis M. Chr. & States (1982)
- Aspergillus neoafricanus
- Aspergillus neoalliaceus A. Nováková, Hubka, Samson, Frisvad & Houbraken (2018)
- Aspergillus neoauricomus
- Aspergillus neobridgeri Frisvad & Samson (2004)
- Aspergillus neocarnoyi Kozak. (1989)
- Aspergillus neoechinulatus
- Aspergillus neoellipticus Kozak. (1989)
- Aspergillus neoflavipes Hubka, A. Nováková, M. Kolařík & S.W. Peterson (2015)
- Aspergillus neoglaber Kozak. (1989)
- Aspergillus neoindicus
- Aspergillus neoniger Varga, Frisvad & Samson (2011)
- Aspergillus neoniveus Samson, S.W. Peterson, Frisvad & Varga (2011)
- Aspergillus neoterreus X.C. Wang & W.Y. Zhuang (2022)
- Aspergillus nidulans (Eidam) G. Winter (1884)
- Aspergillus nidulellus
- Aspergillus niger Tiegh. (1867)
- Aspergillus nigrescens
- Aspergillus nigricans
- Aspergillus nishimurae Takada, Y. Horie & Abliz (2001)
- Aspergillus niveoglaucus Thom & Raper (1941)
- Aspergillus niveus
- Aspergillus noelting
- Aspergillus nomiae Kurtzman, B.W. Horn & Hesselt. (1987)
- Aspergillus nominus
- Aspergillus nomius
- Aspergillus noonimiae Tanney, Visagie & Seifert (2017)
- Aspergillus novofumigatus S.B. Hong, Frisvad & Samson (2006)
- Aspergillus novoguineensis A.J. Chen, Frisvad & Samson (2016)
- Aspergillus novoparasiticus S.S. Gonç., Stchigel, Cano, Colombo & Guarro (2012)
- Aspergillus novofumigatus
- Aspergillus novus
- Aspergillus nutans McLennan & Ducker (1954)

=== O ===
- Aspergillus occultus Visagie, Seifert, Frisvad & Samson (2014)
- Aspergillus ochraceopetaliformis Bat. & Maia (1957)
- Aspergillus ochraceoroseus Bartoli & Maggi (1979)
- Aspergillus ochraceoruber
- Aspergillus ochraceus G. Wilh. (1877)
- Aspergillus oerlinghausenensis Bader & Houbraken (2015)
- Aspergillus okavangoensis Visagie & Nkwe (2021)
- Aspergillus okazakii
- Aspergillus oleicola Frisvad, Zalar & Samson (2008)
- Aspergillus olivaceofuscus
- Aspergillus olivaceus
- Aspergillus olivascens
- Aspergillus olivicola
- Aspergillus olivimuriae Crognale & S.W. Peterson (2019)
- Aspergillus omanensis Y. Horie & Udagawa (1995)
- Aspergillus onikii
- Aspergillus oosporus
- Aspergillus ornatulus Samson & W. Gams (1986)
- Aspergillus ornatus
- Aspergillus oryzae
- Aspergillus osmophilus Askari & Zare (2014)
- Aspergillus ostianus Wehmer (1899)
- Aspergillus otanii Takada, Y. Horie & Abliz (2001)
- Aspergillus ovalispermus
- Aspergillus oxumiae C.N. Figueiredo, L.S. Sales, Y.F. Figueiredo, J.P. Andrade & J.T. De Souza (2020)

=== P ===
- Aspergillus pachycaulis F. Sklenář, S.W. Peterson, Jurjević & Hubka (2017)
- Aspergillus pachycristatus Matsuz., Y. Horie & Yaguchi (2012)
- Aspergillus paleaceus Samson & W. Gams (1986)
- Aspergillus pallidofulvus Visagie, Varga, Frisvad & Samson (2014)
- Aspergillus pallidus Kamyschko (1963)
- Aspergillus panamensis Raper & Thom (1944)
- Aspergillus papuensis (Samson, S.B. Hong & Varga) Samson, S.B. Hong & Varga (2014)
- Aspergillus paradoxus
- Aspergillus parafelis Sugui, S.W. Peterson & Kwon-Chung (2014)
- Aspergillus parasiticus Speare (1912)
- Aspergillus parrulus
- Aspergillus parvathecius Raper & Fennell (1965)
- Aspergillus parvisclerotigenus
- Aspergillus parviverruculosus H.Z. Kong & Z.T. Qi (1995)
- Aspergillus parvulus G. Sm. (1961)
- Aspergillus paulistensi Y. Horie, Miyaji & Nishim. (1995)
- Aspergillus penicillatus
- Aspergillus penicilliformis Kamyschko (1963)
- Aspergillus penicillioides Speg. (1896)
- Aspergillus penicillioideum
- Aspergillus penicillopsis
- Aspergillus pepii Despot, Kocsubé, Varga & Klarić (2016)
- Aspergillus periconioides Sacc. (1913)
- Aspergillus pernambucoensis Y. Horie, Matsuz., Yaguchi & Y. Takaki (2014)
- Aspergillus perniciosus
- Aspergillus persii A.M. Corte & Zotti (2002)
- Aspergillus petersonii Jurjević & Hubka (2015)
- Aspergillus petrakii Vörös-Felkai (1957)
- Aspergillus peyronelii Sappa (1955)
- Aspergillus phaeocephalus
- Aspergillus phialiformis Z.F. Zhang & L. Cai (2020)
- Aspergillus phialiseptatus Kwon-Chung (1975)
- Aspergillus phialosimplex Z.F. Zhang & L. Cai (2020)
- Aspergillus phoenicis
- Aspergillus pidoplichknovii Bilaĭ & Koval (1988)
- Aspergillus pipericola Frisvad, Samson & Houbraken (2018)
- Aspergillus piperis Samson & Frisvad (2004)
- Aspergillus pisci
- Aspergillus pluriseminatus (Stchigel & Guarro) Samson, Visagie & Houbraken (2014)
- Aspergillus polychromus
- Aspergillus polyporicola Hubka, A. Nováková, M. Kolařík & S.W. Peterson (2015)
- Aspergillus porosus Juan Chen, Frisvad & Samson (2017)
- Aspergillus porphyreostipitatus Visagie, Hirooka & Samson (2014)
- Aspergillus posadasensis Y. Marín, Stchigel & Cano (2014)
- Aspergillus pouchetii
- Aspergillus pragensis Hubka, Frisvad & M. Kolařík (2014)
- Aspergillus primulinus Udagawa, Toyaz. & Tsub. (1993)
- Aspergillus profusus
- Aspergillus proliferans G. Sm. (1943)
- Aspergillus protuberus Munt.-Cvetk. (1968)
- Aspergillus posadasensis
- Aspergillus pragensis
- Aspergillus pseudocaelatus Varga, Samson & Frisvad (2011)
- Aspergillus pseudocarbonarius
- Aspergillus pseudocitricus
- Aspergillus pseudoclavatus
- Aspergillus pseudodeflectus Samson & Mouch. (1975)
- Aspergillus pseudoelatior
- Aspergillus pseudoelegans Frisvad & Samson (2004)
- Aspergillus pseudofelis Sugui, S.W. Peterson & Kwon-Chung (2014)
- Aspergillus pseudoflavus
- Aspergillus pseudoglaucus Blochwitz (1929)
- Aspergillus pseudogracilis F. Sklenář, Jurjević & Hubka (2017)
- Aspergillus pseudoheteromorphus
- Aspergillus pseudoniger
- Aspergillus pseudonomius Varga, Samson & Frisvad (2011)
- Aspergillus pseudosclerotiorum Siqueira, Deanna A. Sutton & Gené (2017)
- Aspergillus pseudotamarii Yoko Ito, S.W. Peterson, Wicklow & T. Goto (2001)
- Aspergillus pseudoterreus S.W. Peterson, Samson & Varga (2011)
- Aspergillus pseudoustus Frisvad, Varga & Samson (2011)
- Aspergillus pseudoviridinutans Sugui, S.W. Peterson & Kwon-Chung (2014)
- Aspergillus pulchellus
- Aspergillus pulmonum-hominis
- Aspergillus pulvericola Visagie, Seifert, Frisvad & Samson (2014)
- Aspergillus pulverulentus (McAlpine) Thom (1926)
- Aspergillus pulvinus Kwon-Chung & Fennell (1965)
- Aspergillus puniceus Kwon-Chung & Fennell (1965)
- Aspergillus purpureocrustaceus Visagie (2020)
- Aspergillus purpureofuscus
- Aspergillus purpureus Samson & Mouch. (1975)
- Aspergillus pusillus
- Aspergillus puulaauensis Jurjević, S.W. Peterson & B.W. Horn (2012)
- Aspergillus pyramidus
- Aspergillus pyri

=== Q ===
- Aspergillus qilianyuensis X.C. Wang & W.Y. Zhuang (2022)
- Aspergillus qinqixianii Y. Horie, Abliz & R.Y. Li (2000)
- Aspergillus qizutongii D.M. Li, Y. Horie, Yu X. Wang & R.Y. Li (1998)
- Aspergillus quadricinctus E. Yuill (1953)
- Aspergillus quadricingens Kozak. (1989)
- Aspergillus quadrifidus
- Aspergillus quadrilineatus Thom & Raper (1939)
- Aspergillus quercinus
- Aspergillus quininae
- Aspergillus quitensis

=== R ===
- Aspergillus racemosus
- Aspergillus raianus H.J. Chowdhery (1979)
- Aspergillus rambellii Frisvad & Samson (2005)
- Aspergillus ramosus
- Aspergillus raperi Stolk & J.A. Mey. (1957)
- Aspergillus recifensis A.C.R. Barros-Correia, R.N. Barbosa, Houbraken & Souza-Motta (2020)
- Aspergillus recurvatus Raper & Fennell (1965)
- Aspergillus rehmii
- Aspergillus repandus
- Aspergillus repens (Corda) Sacc. (1882)
- Aspergillus reptans
- Aspergillus restrictus G. Sm. (1931)
- Aspergillus reticulatus F. Sklenář, Jurjević, S.W. Peterson & Hubka (2017)
- Aspergillus rhizopodus J.N. Rai, Wadhwani & S.C. Agarwal (1975)
- Aspergillus robustus M. Chr. & Raper (1978)
- Aspergillus roseoglobosus
- Aspergillus roseoglobulosus Frisvad & Samson (2004)
- Aspergillus roseovelutinus Kamyschko (1968)
- Aspergillus roseus Link ex Berk. (1836)
- Aspergillus ruber (Jos. König, Spieck. & W. Bremer) Thom & Church (1926)
- Aspergillus rubrobrunneus Samson & W. Gams (1986)
- Aspergillus rubrum
- Aspergillus rufescens
- Aspergillus rugulosus Thom & Raper (1939)
- Aspergillus rugulovalvus Samson & W. Gams (1986)
- Aspergillus rutilans

=== S ===
- Aspergillus sacchari
- Aspergillus saccharolyticus A. Sørensen, P.S. Lübeck & Frisvad (2011)
- Aspergillus saitoi Sakag., Iizuka & M. Yamaz. ex Iizuka & K. Sugiy. (1965)
- Aspergillus salinarum (Greiner, Peršoh, Weig & Rambold) Zalar & Greiner (2017)
- Aspergillus salinicola Zalar, F. Sklenář, Visagie & Hubka (2017)
- Aspergillus salisburgensis Zalar, L. Martinelli & G. Piñar (2017)
- Aspergillus salviicola Udagawa, Kamiya & Tsub. (1994)
- Aspergillus salwaensis Visagie, Houbraken, Fotedar, Frisvad & Samson (2014)
- Aspergillus salviicola
- Aspergillus sartoryi
- Aspergillus savannensis A.J. Chen, Frisvad & Samson (2016)
- Aspergillus scheelei
- Aspergillus schiemanniae
- Aspergillus sclerogenus Dadal. (1978)
- Aspergillus sclerotialis (W. Gams & Breton) Houbraken, Tanney, Visagie & Samson (2014)
- Aspergillus sclerotiicarbonarius Noonim, Frisvad, Varga & Samson (2008)
- Aspergillus sclerotioniger Samson & Frisvad (2004)
- Aspergillus sclerotiorum G.A. Huber (1933)
- Aspergillus seifertii Visagie & N. Yilmaz (2020)
- Aspergillus sejunctus
- Aspergillus septatus
- Aspergillus sepultus Tuthill & M. Chr. (1986)
- Aspergillus sergii P. Rodrigues, S.W. Peterson, Venâncio & N. Lima (2012)
- Aspergillus serratalhadensis L.F. Oliveira, R.N. Barbosa, G.M.R. Albuq., Souza-Motta & Viana Marques (2018)
- Aspergillus sesamicola Visagie, Frisvad & Samson (2014)
- Aspergillus shendaweii (Yaguchi, Abliz & Y. Horie) Samson, Visagie & Houbraken (2014)
- Aspergillus siamensis Manoah, Eamvijarn & Yaguchi (2013)
- Aspergillus sigurros Visagie (2020)
- Aspergillus silvaticus Fennell & Raper (1955)
- Aspergillus similanensis Dethoup (2016)
- Aspergillus similis (Y. Horie, Udagawa, Abdullah & Al-Bader) Samson, Visagie & Houbraken (2014)
- Aspergillus simplex
- Aspergillus sloanii Visagie, Hirooka & Samson (2014)
- Aspergillus sojae Sakag. & K. Yamada ex Murak. (1971)
- Aspergillus solicola Samson, Visagie & Houbraken (2014)
- Aspergillus sparsus Raper & Thom (1944)
- Aspergillus spathulatus Takada & Udagawa (1985)
- Aspergillus spectabilis M. Chr. & Raper (1978)
- Aspergillus spelaeus A. Nováková, Hubka, S.W. Peterson & M. Kolařík (2015)
- Aspergillus spelunceus Raper & Fennell (1965)
- Aspergillus spiculosus Blaser (1976)
- Aspergillus spinosus Kozak. (1989)
- Aspergillus spinulosporus Hubka, S.W. Peterson & M. Kolařík (2016)
- Aspergillus spinulosus Warcup (1965)
- Aspergillus spiralis
- Aspergillus stella-maris Zalar, Frisvad & Samson (2008)
- Aspergillus stellatus Curzi (1934)
- Aspergillus stellifer Samson & W. Gams (1986)
- Aspergillus stelliformis F. Sklenar, Jurjević & Hubka (2020)
- Aspergillus stercorarius A.J. Chen, Frisvad & Samson (2016)
- Aspergillus sterigmatophorus
- Aspergillus steynii Frisvad & Samson (2004)
- Aspergillus stramenius R.O. Novak & Raper (1965)
- Aspergillus striatulus Samson & W. Gams (1986)
- Aspergillus striatus J.N. Rai, J.P. Tewari & Mukerji (1964)
- Aspergillus stromatoides Raper & Fennell (1965)
- Aspergillus strychni
- Aspergillus subalbidus Visagie, Hirooka & Samson (2014)
- Aspergillus subflavus Hubka, A. Nováková, Samson, Frisvad & Houbraken (2018)
- Aspergillus subfuscus
- Aspergillus subgriseus
- Aspergillus sublatus Y. Horie (1979)
- Aspergillus sublevisporus Someya, Yaguchi & Udagawa (1999)
- Aspergillus subnutans A.J. Chen, Frisvad & Samson (2016)
- Aspergillus subolivaceus Raper & Fennell (1965)
- Aspergillus subramanianii Visagie, Frisvad & Samson (2014)
- Aspergillus subsessilis Raper & Fennell (1965)
- Aspergillus subunguis Wadhwani, Dudeja & M.P. Srivast. (1984)
- Aspergillus subversicolor Jurjević, S.W. Peterson & B.W. Horn (2012)
- Aspergillus sulphureoviridis A.J. Chen, Frisvad & Samson (2016)
- Aspergillus sulphureus
- Aspergillus sunderbanii
- Aspergillus suttoniae J.P.Z. Siqueira, J. Gené, D. García & J. Guarro (2018)
- Aspergillus sydowii (Bainier & Sartory) Thom & Church (1926)
- Aspergillus sylvaticus
- Aspergillus syncephalis

=== T ===
- Aspergillus tabacinus
- Aspergillus taichungensis Yaguchi, Someya & Udagawa (1995)
- Aspergillus takadae Y. Horie, Yaguchi, Abliz & Matsuzawa (2019)
- Aspergillus takakii Y. Horie, Abliz & K. Fukush. (1999)
- Aspergillus taklimakanensis Abliz & Y. Horie (2001)
- Aspergillus tamarii Kita (1913)
- Aspergillus tamarindosoli Juan Chen, Frisvad & Samson (2017)
- Aspergillus tanneri Kwon-Chung, Sugui & S.W. Peterson (2012)
- Aspergillus tapirirae C. Ram & A. Ram (1972)
- Aspergillus tardicrescens F. Sklenář, Houbraken, Zalar & Hubka (2017)
- Aspergillus tardus Bissett & Widden (1985)
- Aspergillus tasmanicus Hubka, Kubátová, Frisvad & M. Kolařík (2017)
- Aspergillus tatenoi Y. Horie, Miyaji, Koji Yokoy., Udagawa & Camp.-Takagi (1992)
- Aspergillus telluris B.D. Sun, X.Z. Jiang & A.J. Chen (2020)
- Aspergillus templicola Visagie, Hirooka & Samson (2014)
- Aspergillus tennesseensis Jurjević, S.W. Peterson & B.W. Horn (2012)
- Aspergillus teporis Juan Chen, Frisvad & Samson (2017)
- Aspergillus terrestris
- Aspergillus terreus Thom (1918)
- Aspergillus terricola Marchal & É.J. Marchal (1893)
- Aspergillus testaceocolorans Novobr. (1972)
- Aspergillus tetrazonus
- Aspergillus texensis P. Singh, M.J. Orbach & P.J. Cotty (2018)
- Aspergillus thailandensis Tanney, Visagie & Seifert (2017)
- Aspergillus thermomutatus
- Aspergillus thesauricus Hubka & A. Nováková (2012)
- Aspergillus thomi G. Sm. (1951)
- Aspergillus tiraboschii
- Aspergillus togoensis (Henn.) Samson & Seifert (1986)
- Aspergillus tokelau
- Aspergillus tonophilus Ohtsuki (1962)
- Aspergillus toxicarius
- Aspergillus toxicus Pummi Singh, K.A. Callicott, M.J. Orbach & P.J. Cotty (2020)
- Aspergillus transcarpathicus A.J. Chen, Frisvad & Samson (2016)
- Aspergillus transmontanensis P. Rodrigues, S.W. Peterson, N. Lima & Venâncio (2012)
- Aspergillus trinidadensis Jurjević, G. Perrone & S.W. Peterson (2012)
- Aspergillus trisporus Souza, Pereira, Moreira & Batista (2019)
- Aspergillus tritici B.S. Mehrotra & M. Basu (1976)
- Aspergillus tsunodae (Yaguchi, Abliz & Y. Horie) Samson, Visagie & Houbraken (2014)
- Aspergillus tsurutae Y. Horie (2003)
- Aspergillus tuberculatus Z.T. Qi & Z.M. Sun (1994)
- Aspergillus tubingensis Mosseray (1934)
- Aspergillus tumidus J.P.Z. Siqueira, Gené, Dania García & Guarro (2018)
- Aspergillus tunetanus
- Aspergillus turcosus S.B. Hong, Frisvad & Samson (2008)
- Aspergillus turkensis Varga, Frisvad & Samson (2011)

=== U ===
- Aspergillus udagawae Y. Horie, Miyaji & Nishim. (1995)
- Aspergillus umbrinus
- Aspergillus umbrosus Bainier & Sartory (1912)
- Aspergillus undulatus H.Z. Kong & Z.T. Qi (1986)
- Aspergillus unguis (Émile-Weill & L. Gaudin) Thom & Raper (1934)
- Aspergillus unilateralis Thrower (1954)
- Aspergillus urmiensis Arzanlou, Houbraken & Samadi (2016)
- Aspergillus usamii
- Aspergillus ustilago
- Aspergillus ustus (Bainier) Thom & Church (1926)
- Aspergillus uvarum G. Perrone, Varga & Kozak. (2008)

=== V ===
- Aspergillus vadensis R.P. de Vries, K. Burgers, Vonderv., Frisvad, Samson & J. Visser (2004)
- Aspergillus vancampenhoutii
- Aspergillus vandermerwei Frisvad, Hubka, Samson & Houbraken (2018)
- Aspergillus varanasensis
- Aspergillus variabilis
- Aspergillus varians Wehmer (1899)
- Aspergillus variecolor
- Aspergillus variegatus
- Aspergillus velutinus
- Aspergillus venenatus Jurjević, S.W. Peterson & B.W. Horn (2012)
- Aspergillus venezuelensis Frisvad & Samson (2004)
- Aspergillus versicolor (Vuill.) Tirab. (1908)
- Aspergillus villosus F. Sklenář, S.W. Peterson & Hubka (2017)
- Aspergillus vinaceus Ferranti, Iamanaka, Frisvad, O. Puel & J.J. da Silva (2020)
- Aspergillus vinosobubalinus Udagawa, Kamiya & Kaori Osada (1993)
- Aspergillus violaceobrunneus Samson & W. Gams (1986)
- Aspergillus violaceofuscus Gasperini (1887)
- Aspergillus violaceus Fennell & Raper (1955)
- Aspergillus virens
- Aspergillus viridicatenatus A.J. Chen, Frisvad & Samson (2016)
- Aspergillus viridigriseus
- Aspergillus viridinutans Ducker & Thrower (1954)
- Aspergillus vitellinus (Ridl.) Samson & Seifert (1986)
- Aspergillus vitis
- Aspergillus vitricola

=== W ===
- Aspergillus waksmanii Hubka, S.W. Peterson, Frisvad & M. Kolařík (2013)
- Aspergillus wangduanlii D.M. Li, Y. Horie, Yu X. Wang & R.Y. Li (1998)
- Aspergillus warcupii Samson & W. Gams (1986)
- Aspergillus waynelawii Tanney, Visagie & Seifert (2017)
- Aspergillus wehmeri
- Aspergillus welwitschiae (Bres.) Henn. (1907)
- Aspergillus wentii Wehmer (1896)
- Aspergillus westendorpii
- Aspergillus westlandensis
- Aspergillus westerdijkiae Frisvad & Samson (2004)
- Aspergillus westlandensis Visagie, Varga, M. Meijer & Frisvad (2014)
- Aspergillus whitfieldii Tanney, Visagie & Seifert (2017)
- Aspergillus wisconsinensis A.J. Chen, Frisvad & Samson (2016)
- Aspergillus wyomingensis A. Nováková, Dudová & Hubka (2013)

=== X ===
- Aspergillus xerophilus Samson & Mouch. (1975)
- Aspergillus xishaensis X.C. Wang & W.Y. Zhuang (2022)

=== Y ===
- Aspergillus yezoensis
- Aspergillus yunnanensis W.J. Cai, X.Z. Jiang, B.D. Sun & A.J. Chen (2019)

=== Z ===
- Aspergillus zhaoqingensis Z.T. Qi & Z.M. Sun (1991)
- Aspergillus zonatus
- Aspergillus zutongqii Juan Chen, Frisvad & Samson (2017)
