= Aspergillus spinulosporus =

Scientific classification
- Kingdom: Fungi
- Division: Ascomycota
- Class: Eurotiomycetes
- Order: Eurotiales
- Family: Aspergillaceae
- Genus: Aspergillus
- Species: A. spinulosporus

Binomial name
- Aspergillus spinulosporus Hubka, S.W. Peterson, M. Kolařík (2016)

Synonyms
- A. delacroxcii and A. neoechinulatus

Species of fungus

Aspergillus spinulosporus is a species of fungus in the genus Aspergillus. It is from the Nidulantes section. It was first described in 2016. It has been reported to produce asperthecin, echinocandin B1, desferritriacetylfusigen, and sterigmatocystin.

In 2016, the genome of A. spinulosporus was, under the name A. neoechinulatus, sequenced as a part of the Aspergillus whole-genome sequencing project - a project dedicated to performing whole-genome sequencing of all members of the genus Aspergillus. The genome assembly size was 30.67 Mbp.

== Growth and morphology ==
A. spinulosporus has been cultivated on both Czapek yeast extract agar (CYA) plates and Malt Extract Agar Oxoid® (MEAOX) plates. The growth morphology of the colonies can be seen in the pictures below.

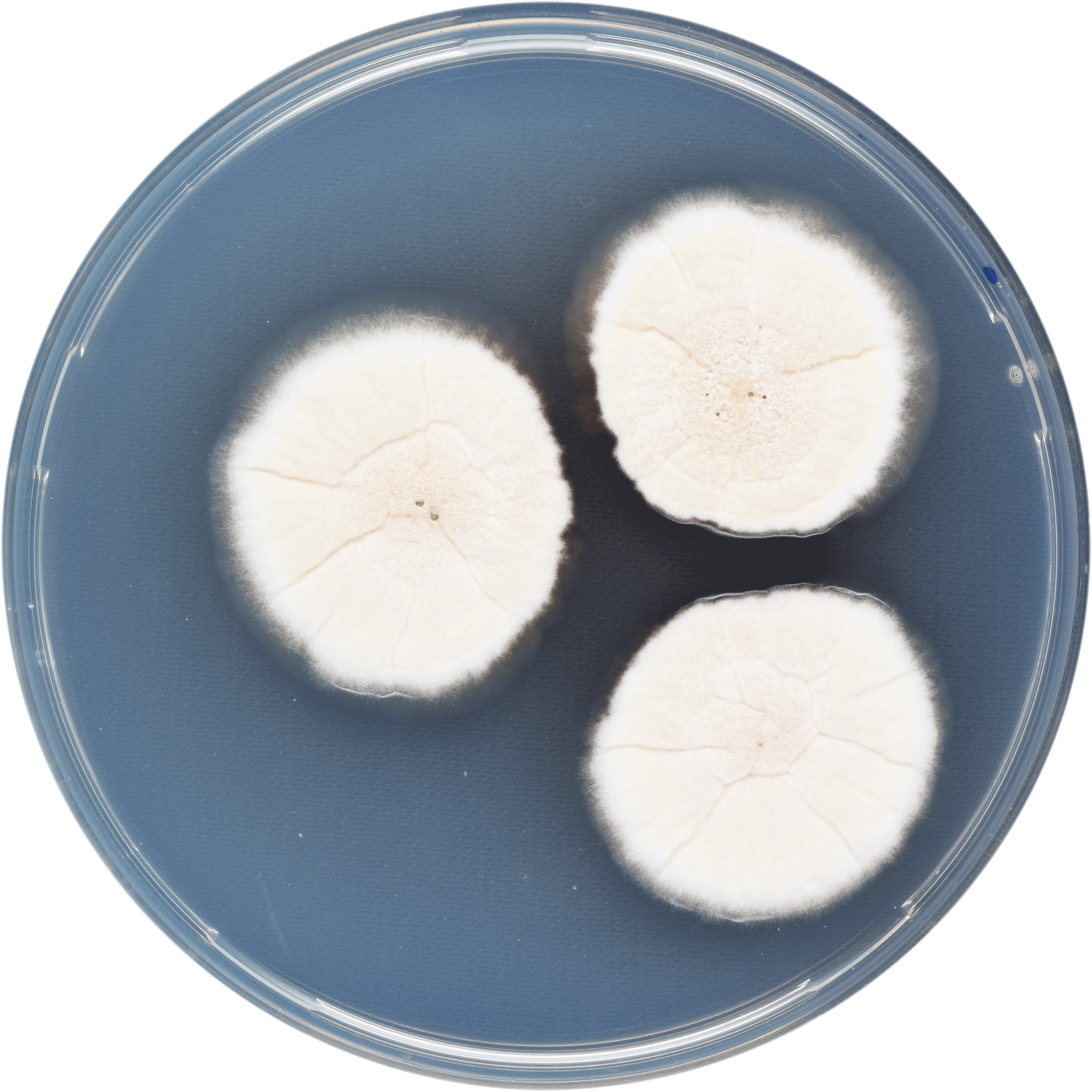
Aspergillus spinulosporus growing on CYA plate

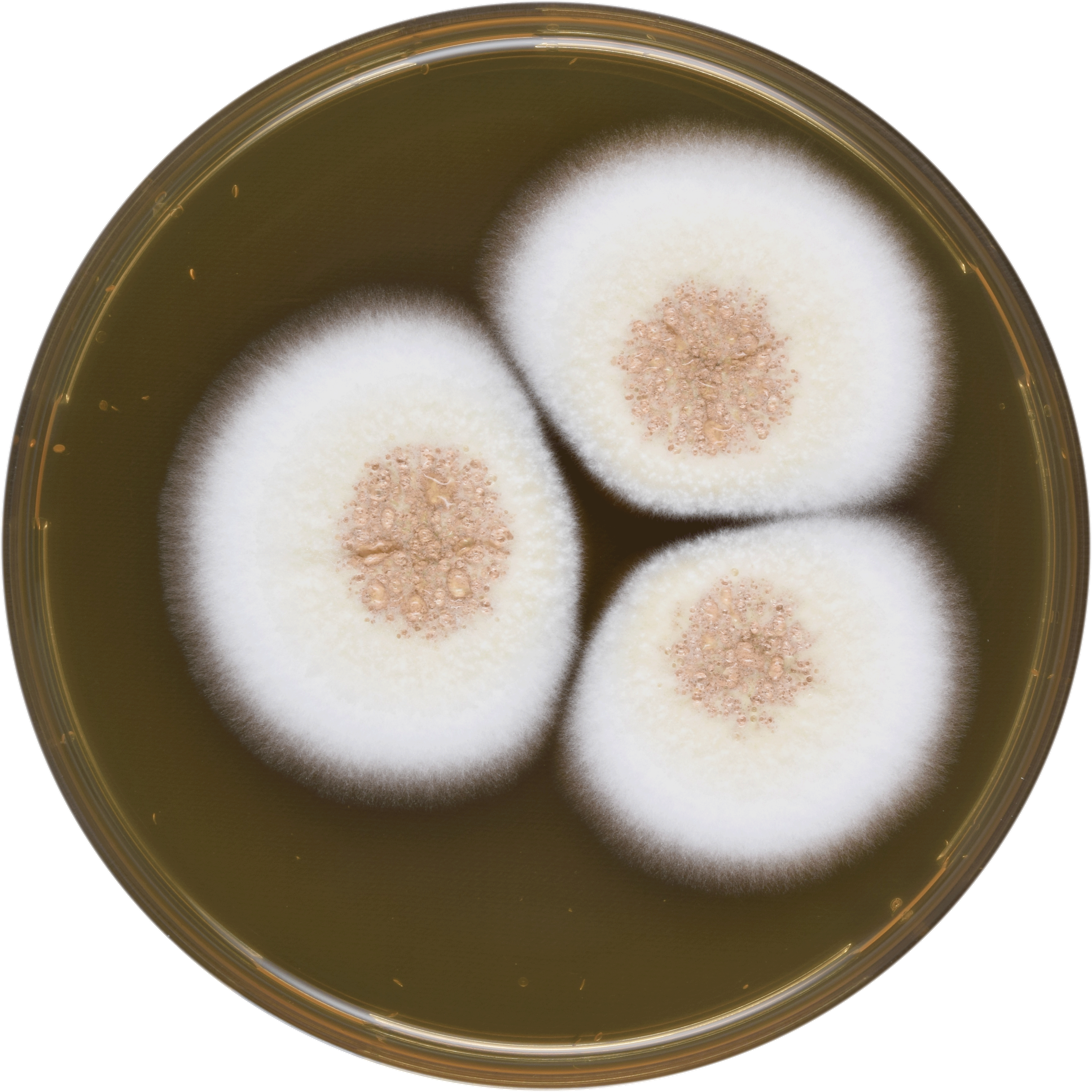
Aspergillus spinulosporus growing on MEAOX plate
