= Aspergillus sclerotiicarbonarius =

Scientific classification
- Kingdom: Fungi
- Division: Ascomycota
- Class: Eurotiomycetes
- Order: Eurotiales
- Family: Aspergillaceae
- Genus: Aspergillus
- Species: A. sclerotiicarbonarius

Binomial name
- Aspergillus sclerotiicarbonarius Noonim, Frisvad, Varga & Samson (2008)

Species of fungus

Aspergillus sclerotiicarbonarius is a species of fungus in the genus Aspergillus. It belongs to the group of black Aspergilli which are important industrial workhorses. A. sclerotiicarbonarius belongs to the Nigri section. The species was first described in 2008. It has been isolated from Thai coffee beans.

The genome of A. sclerotiicarbonarius was sequenced and published in 2014 as part of the Aspergillus whole-genome sequencing project – a project dedicated to performing whole-genome sequencing of all members of the genus Aspergillus. The genome assembly size was 37.62 Mbp.

== Growth and morphology ==
Aspergillus sclerotiicarbonarius has been cultivated on both Czapek yeast extract agar (CYA) plates and Malt Extract Agar Oxoid (MEAOX) plates. The growth morphology of the colonies can be seen in the pictures below.

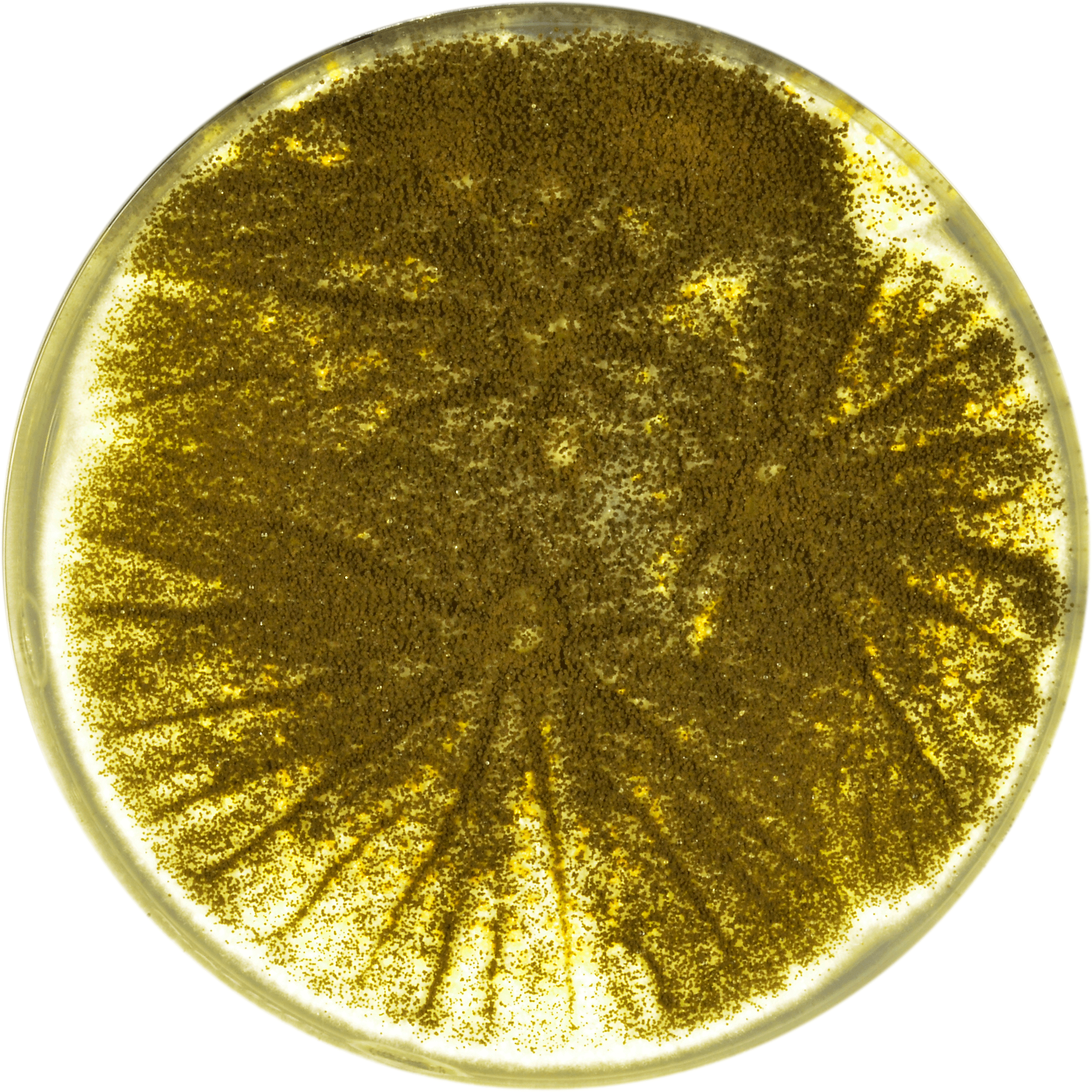
Aspergillus sclerotiicarbonarius growing on CYA plate

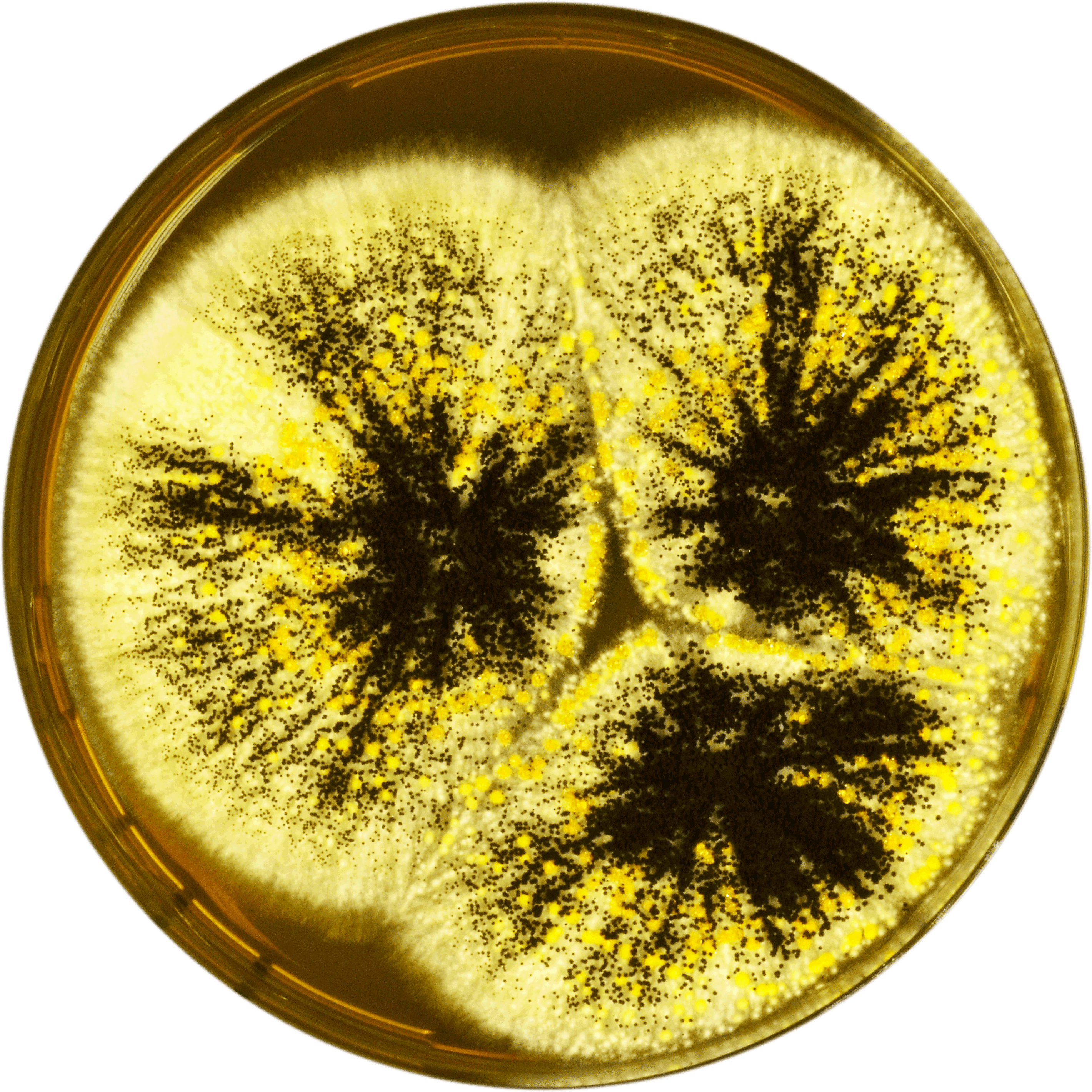
Aspergillus sclerotiicarbonarius growing on MEAOX plate
