= Aspergillus canadensis =

Scientific classification
- Kingdom: Fungi
- Division: Ascomycota
- Class: Eurotiomycetes
- Order: Eurotiales
- Family: Aspergillaceae
- Genus: Aspergillus
- Species: A. canadensis

Binomial name
- Aspergillus canadensis Visagie, Yilmaz, Sklenar & Seifert (2017)

Species of fungus

Aspergillus canadensis is a species of fungus in the genus Aspergillus. It is from the Robusti section. The species was first described in 2017. It has been isolated from house dust in Canada. It has been reported to produce asperglaucide, aurantiamide, and asperphenamate.
