= Aspergillus tardus =

Scientific classification
- Kingdom: Fungi
- Division: Ascomycota
- Class: Eurotiomycetes
- Order: Eurotiales
- Family: Aspergillaceae
- Genus: Aspergillus
- Species: A. tardus

Binomial name
- Aspergillus tardus Bissett & Widden (1984)

Species of fungus

Aspergillus tardus is a species of fungus in the genus Aspergillus. It is from the Cremei section. The species was first described in 1984.
