= Aspergillus xerophilus =

Scientific classification
- Kingdom: Fungi
- Division: Ascomycota
- Class: Eurotiomycetes
- Order: Eurotiales
- Family: Aspergillaceae
- Genus: Aspergillus
- Species: A. xerophilus

Binomial name
- Aspergillus xerophilus Samson & Mouchacca (1975)

Type strain
- CBS 938.73, FRR 2804, IMI 278377, JCM 1583, NRRL 6131, PIL 622

Synonyms
- Eurotium xerophilum

Species of fungus

Aspergillus xerophilus is a species of fungus in the genus Aspergillus. It is from the Aspergillus section. The species was first described in 1975. It has been reported to produce bisanthrons, dihydroauroglaucin, echinulins, erythroglaucin, isoechinulins, neoechinulins, physcion, sulochrin, and tetracyclic.
