= Aspergillus europaeus =

Scientific classification
- Kingdom: Fungi
- Division: Ascomycota
- Class: Eurotiomycetes
- Order: Eurotiales
- Family: Aspergillaceae
- Genus: Aspergillus
- Species: A. europaeus

Binomial name
- Aspergillus europaeus Hubka, A. Nováková, Samson, Houbraken, Frisvad, M. Kolařík (2016)

Synonyms
- A. sauternesii

Species of fungus

Aspergillus europaeus (also referred to as A. sauternesii) is a species of fungus in the genus Aspergillus. It is from the Cremei section. The species was first described in 2016. It has been reported to produce sulochrins and bianthrons.
