= Aspergillus reticulatus =

Scientific classification
- Kingdom: Fungi
- Division: Ascomycota
- Class: Eurotiomycetes
- Order: Eurotiales
- Family: Aspergillaceae
- Genus: Aspergillus
- Species: A. reticulatus

Binomial name
- Aspergillus reticulatus Sklenar, Jurjević, S.W. Peterson & Hubka (2017)

Species of fungus

Aspergillus reticulatus is a species of fungus in the genus Aspergillus. It is from the Robusti section. The species was first described in 2017. It has been isolated from a lung biopsy in the United States, air in Puerto Rico and elsewhere in the United States, dust in Belgium, oil paintings in Slovenia, and a leather shoe in the Czech Republic. It has been reported to produce asperglaucide, aurantiamide, indole alkaloid A, and clavatol D.
