= Aspergillus hordei =

Scientific classification
- Kingdom: Fungi
- Division: Ascomycota
- Class: Eurotiomycetes
- Order: Eurotiales
- Family: Aspergillaceae
- Genus: Aspergillus
- Species: A. hordei

Binomial name
- Aspergillus hordei Sklenar, S.W. Peterson & Hubka (2017)

Species of fungus

Aspergillus hordei is a species of fungus in the genus Aspergillus. It is from the Robusti section. The species was first described in 2017. It has been isolated from barley in the United States. It has been reported to produce asperglaucide, aurantiamide, aurantiamide B, cristatine A, and echinulin.
