= Aspergillus magnivesiculatus =

Scientific classification
- Kingdom: Fungi
- Division: Ascomycota
- Class: Eurotiomycetes
- Order: Eurotiales
- Family: Aspergillaceae
- Genus: Aspergillus
- Species: A. magnivesiculatus

Binomial name
- Aspergillus magnivesiculatus Sklenar, Zalar, Jurjević & Hubka (2017)

Species of fungus

Aspergillus magnivesiculatus is a species of fungus in the genus Aspergillus. It is from the Robusti section. The species was first described in 2017. It has been isolated from katsuobushi in Japan, and from air and dried corn in the United States. It has been reported to produce asperglaucide, cristatin A, echinulin, indole alkaloid A, and antarone A.
