= Aspergillus cervinus =

Scientific classification
- Kingdom: Fungi
- Division: Ascomycota
- Class: Eurotiomycetes
- Order: Eurotiales
- Family: Aspergillaceae
- Genus: Aspergillus
- Species: A. cervinus

Binomial name
- Aspergillus cervinus Massee (1914)

Species of fungus

Aspergillus cervinus is a species of fungus in the genus Aspergillus. It is from the Cervini section. The species was first described in 1914. It has been reported to produce terremutin, dihydroxy-2,5-toluquinone, xanthocillin, and sclerin.

== Growth and morphology ==
A. cervinus has been cultivated on both Czapek yeast extract agar (CYA) plates and Malt Extract Agar Oxoid® (MEAOX) plates. The growth morphology of the colonies can be seen in the pictures below.

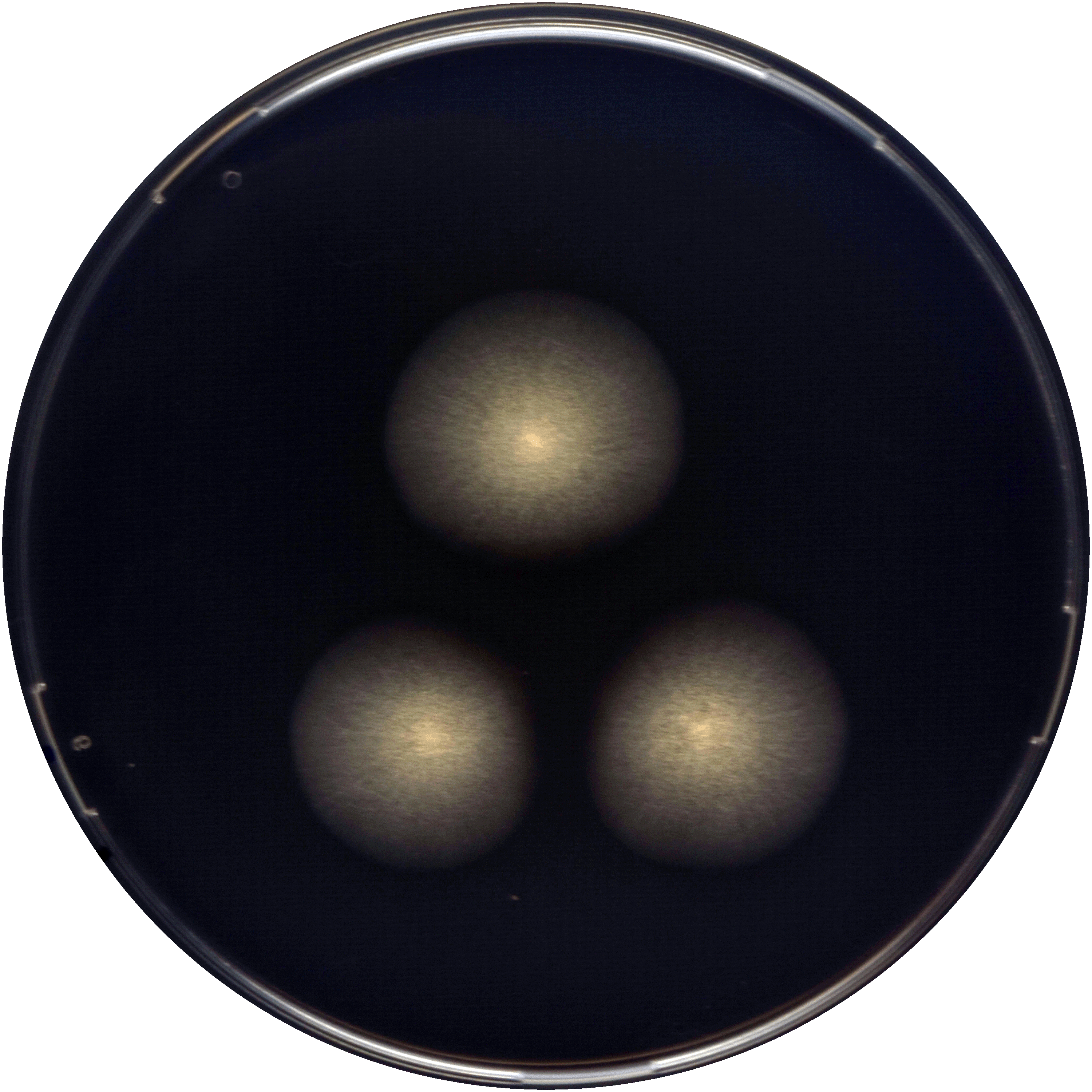
Aspergillus cervinus growing on CYA plate

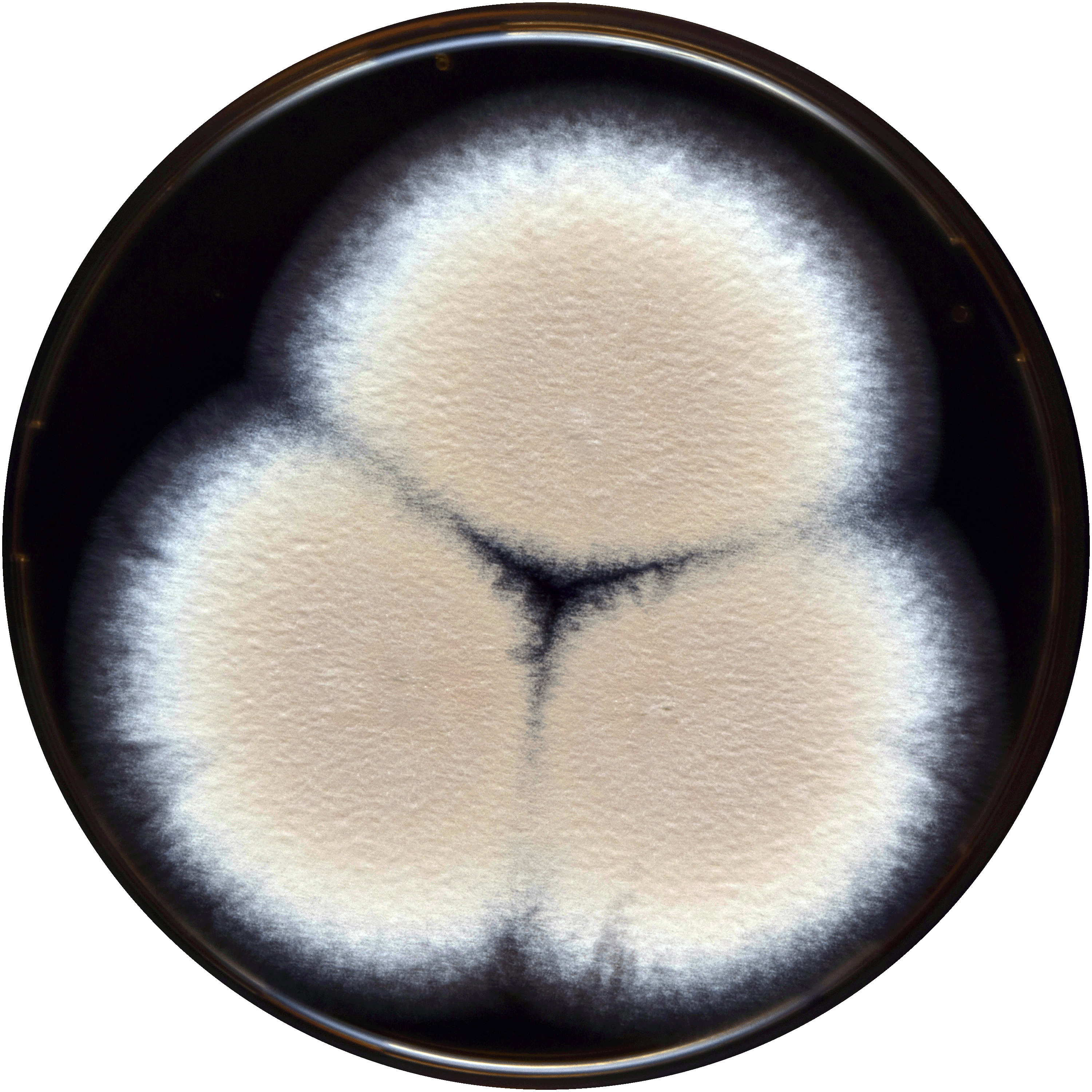
Aspergillus cervinus growing on MEAOX plate
