= Aspergillus novofumigatus =

Scientific classification
- Kingdom: Fungi
- Division: Ascomycota
- Class: Eurotiomycetes
- Order: Eurotiales
- Family: Aspergillaceae
- Genus: Aspergillus
- Species: A. novofumigatus

Binomial name
- Aspergillus novofumigatus S.B. Hong, Frisvad & Samson (2006)

Species of fungus

Aspergillus novofumigatus is a species of fungus in the genus Aspergillus. It is from the Fumigati section. Several fungi from this section produce heat-resistant ascospores, and the isolates from this section are frequently obtained from locations where natural fires have previously occurred. The species was first described in 2006. It was isolated from soil from the Galapagos Islands. It has been shown to produce aszonalenin, cycloechinuline, fiscalins, helvolic acid, neosartorin, palitantin, terrein, and territrem B.

In 2014, the genome of A. novofumigatus was sequenced as a part of the Aspergillus whole-genome sequencing project - a project dedicated to performing whole-genome sequencing of all members of the genus Aspergillus. The genome assembly size was 32.44 Mbp.
