= Aspergillus umbrosus =

Scientific classification
- Kingdom: Fungi
- Division: Ascomycota
- Class: Eurotiomycetes
- Order: Eurotiales
- Family: Aspergillaceae
- Genus: Aspergillus
- Species: A. umbrosus

Binomial name
- Aspergillus umbrosus Bainier & Sartory (1912)

Synonyms
- Aspergillus glaucus

Species of fungus

Aspergillus umbrosus (also named A. glaucus) is a species of fungus in the genus Aspergillus. It is from the Aspergillus section. The species was first described in 1912. It has been reported to produce asperflavin, auroglaucin, bisanthrons, dihydroauroglaucin, echinulins, emodin, epiheveadrides, erythroglaucin, flavoglaucin, isoechinulins, neoechinulins, physcion, questin, questinol, tetracyclic, and tetrahydroauroglaucin.
