= Aspergillus paleaceus =

Scientific classification
- Kingdom: Fungi
- Division: Ascomycota
- Class: Eurotiomycetes
- Order: Eurotiales
- Family: Aspergillaceae
- Genus: Aspergillus
- Species: A. paleaceus

Binomial name
- Aspergillus paleaceus Samson & W. Gams (1985)

Synonyms
- Neosartorya stramenia

Species of fungus

Aspergillus paleaceus (also named Neosartorya stramenia) is a species of fungus in the genus Aspergillus. It is from the Fumigati section. The species was first described in 1985. It has been reported to produce quinolactacin and avenaciolide.

== Growth and morphology ==
A. paleaceus has been cultivated on both Czapek yeast extract agar (CYA) plates and Malt Extract Agar Oxoid® (MEAOX) plates. The growth morphology of the colonies can be seen in the pictures below.

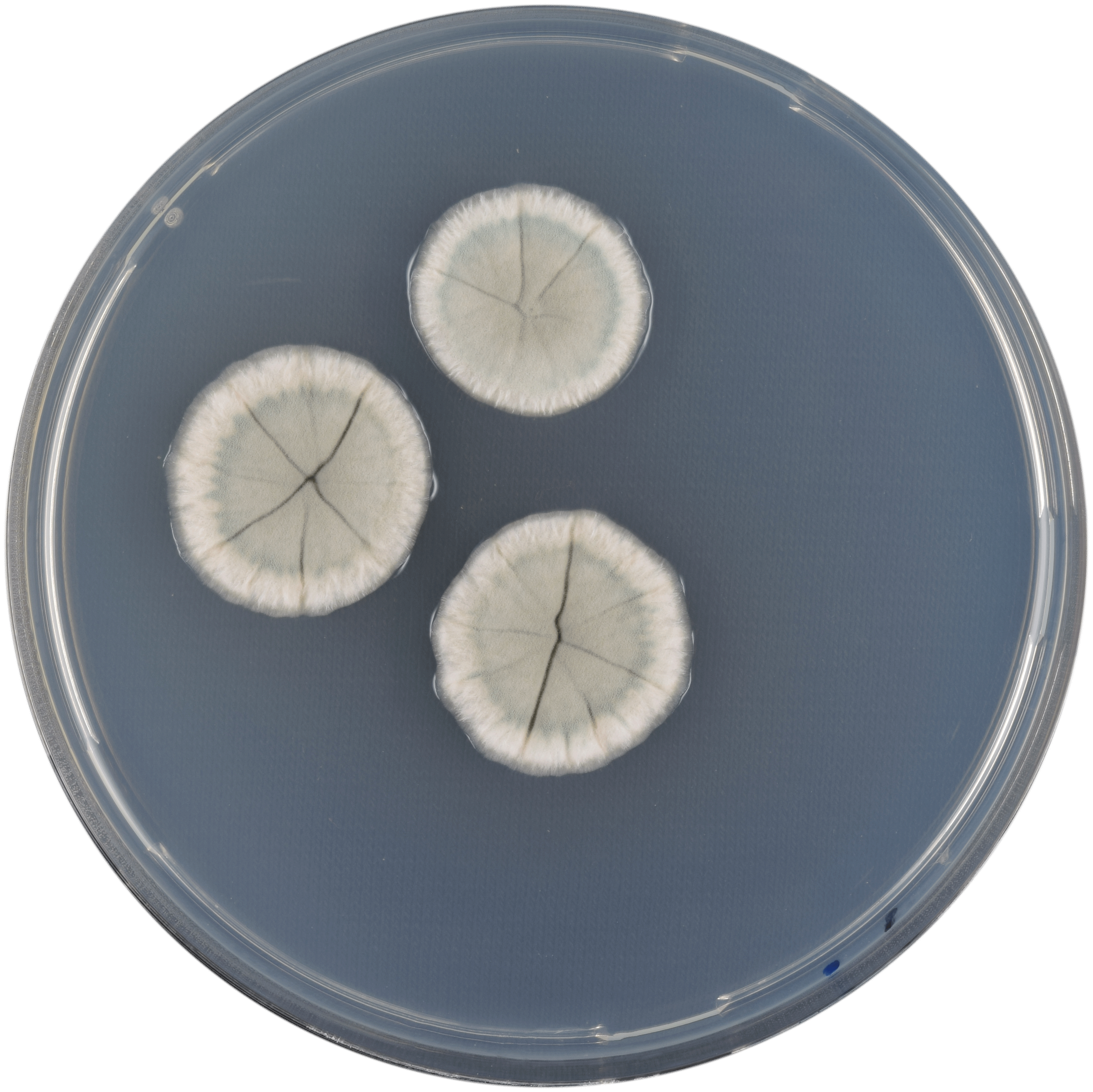
Aspergillus paleaceus growing on CYA plate

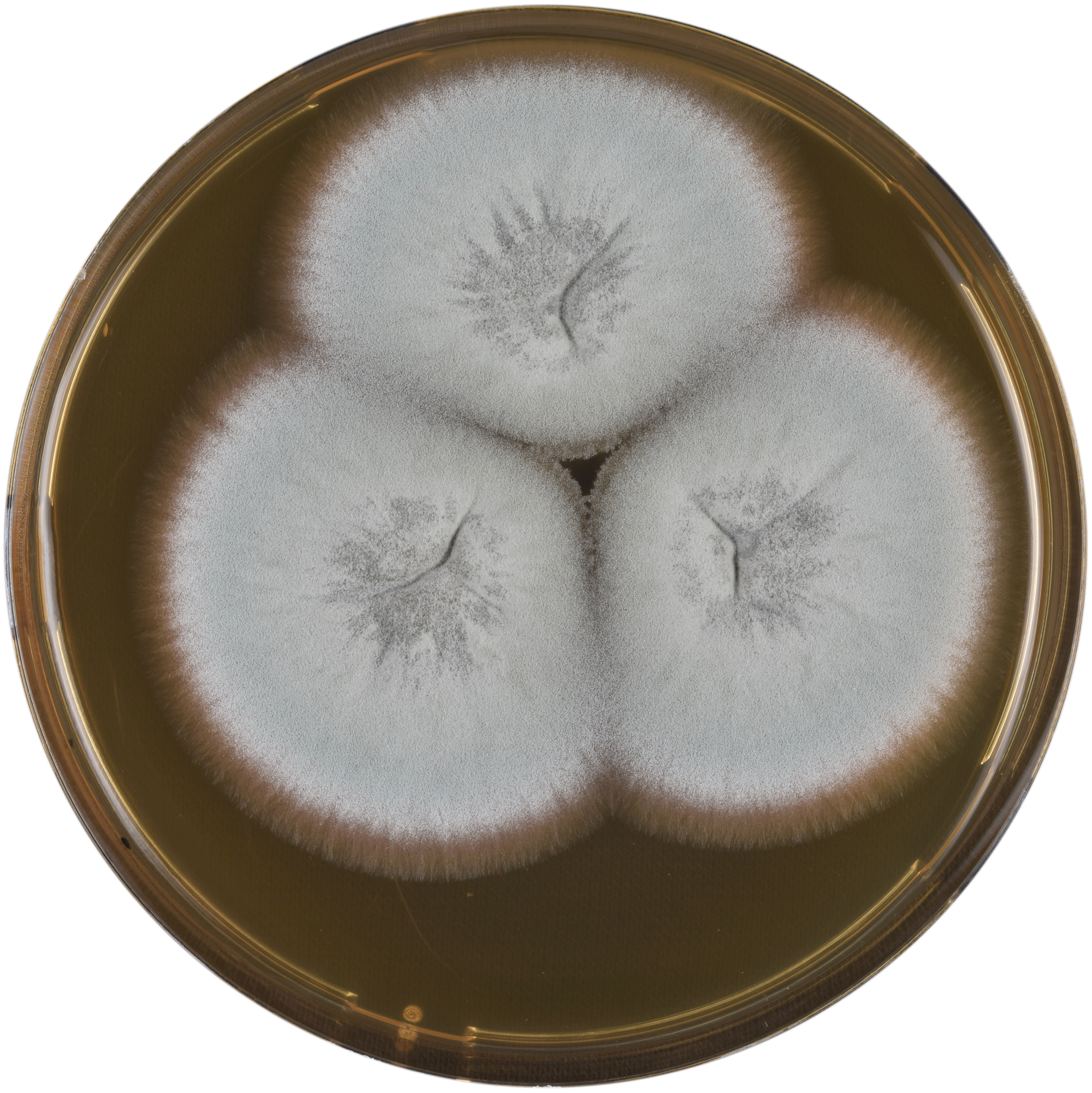
Aspergillus paleaceus growing on MEAOX plate
