= Aspergillus homomorphus =

Scientific classification
- Kingdom: Fungi
- Division: Ascomycota
- Class: Eurotiomycetes
- Order: Eurotiales
- Family: Aspergillaceae
- Genus: Aspergillus
- Species: A. homomorphus

Binomial name
- Aspergillus homomorphus Steiman, Guiraud, Sage & Seigle-Murandi ex Frisvad & Samson (2004)

Species of fungus

Aspergillus homomorphus is a species of fungus in the genus Aspergillus. It belongs to the group of black Aspergilli which are important industrial workhorses. A. homomorphus belongs to the Nigri section. The species was first described in 1995. It has been isolated from soil from the Dead Sea in Israel. The mycotoxin secalonic acid D has been reported from this fungus. In addition, it produces many exometabolites only found in this fungus.

The genome of A. homomorphus was sequenced and published in 2014 as part of the Aspergillus whole-genome sequencing project – a project dedicated to performing whole-genome sequencing of all members of the genus Aspergillus. The genome assembly size was 34.05 Mbp.

== Growth and morphology ==
Aspergillus homomorphus has been cultivated on both Czapek yeast extract agar (CYA) plates and Malt Extract Agar Oxoid® (MEAOX) plates. The growth morphology of the colonies can be seen in the pictures below.

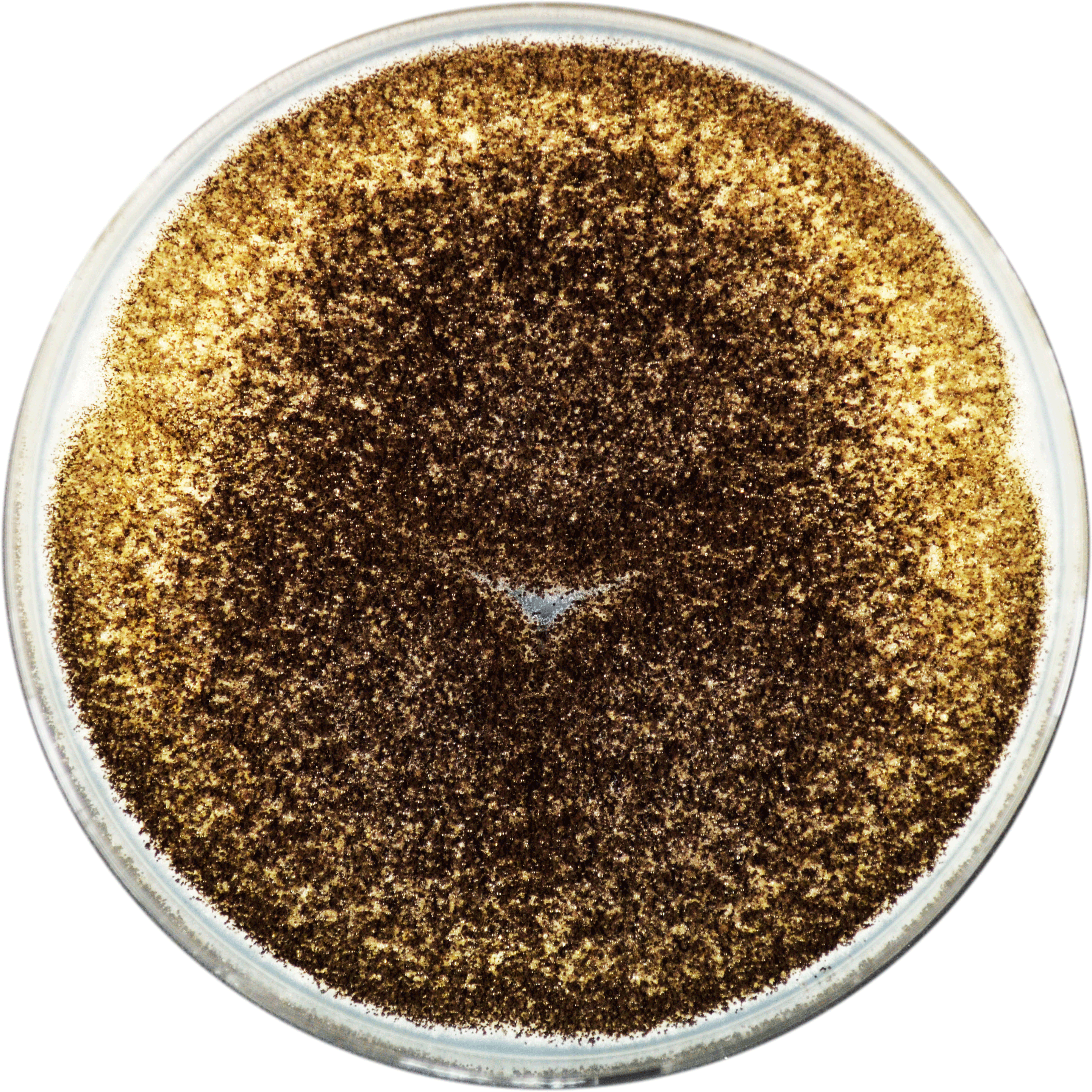
Aspergillus homomorphus growing on CYA plate

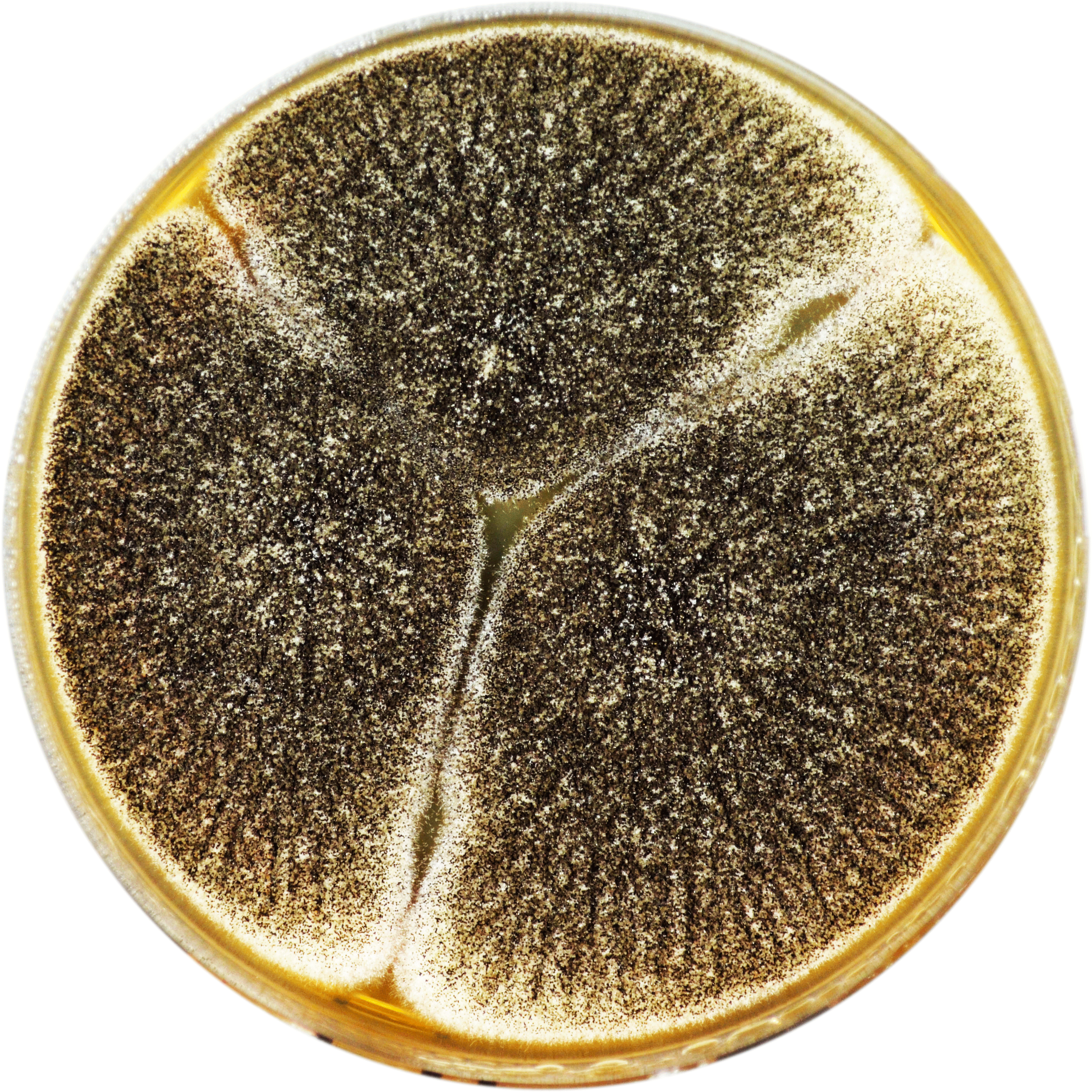
Aspergillus homomorphus growing on MEAOX plate
