= Aspergillus indologenus =

Scientific classification
- Kingdom: Fungi
- Division: Ascomycota
- Class: Eurotiomycetes
- Order: Eurotiales
- Family: Aspergillaceae
- Genus: Aspergillus
- Species: A. indologenus

Binomial name
- Aspergillus indologenus Frisvad, Varga & Samson (2011)

Species of fungus

Aspergillus indologenus is a species of fungus in the genus Aspergillus. It belongs to the group of black Aspergilli which are important industrial workhorses. A. indologenus belongs to the Nigri section. The species was first described in 2011. It was isolated from soil in India and found to produce insecticidal compounds okaramins A, B, H, and two types of indol-alkaloids which have not been structure elucidated.

The genome of A. indologenus was sequenced and published in 2014 as part of the Aspergillus whole-genome sequencing project – a project dedicated to performing whole-genome sequencing of all members of the genus Aspergillus. The genome assembly size was 38.59 Mbp.

== Growth and morphology ==
Aspergillus indologenus has been cultivated on both Czapek yeast extract agar (CYA) plates and Malt Extract Agar Oxoid® (MEAOX) plates. The growth morphology of the colonies can be seen in the pictures below.

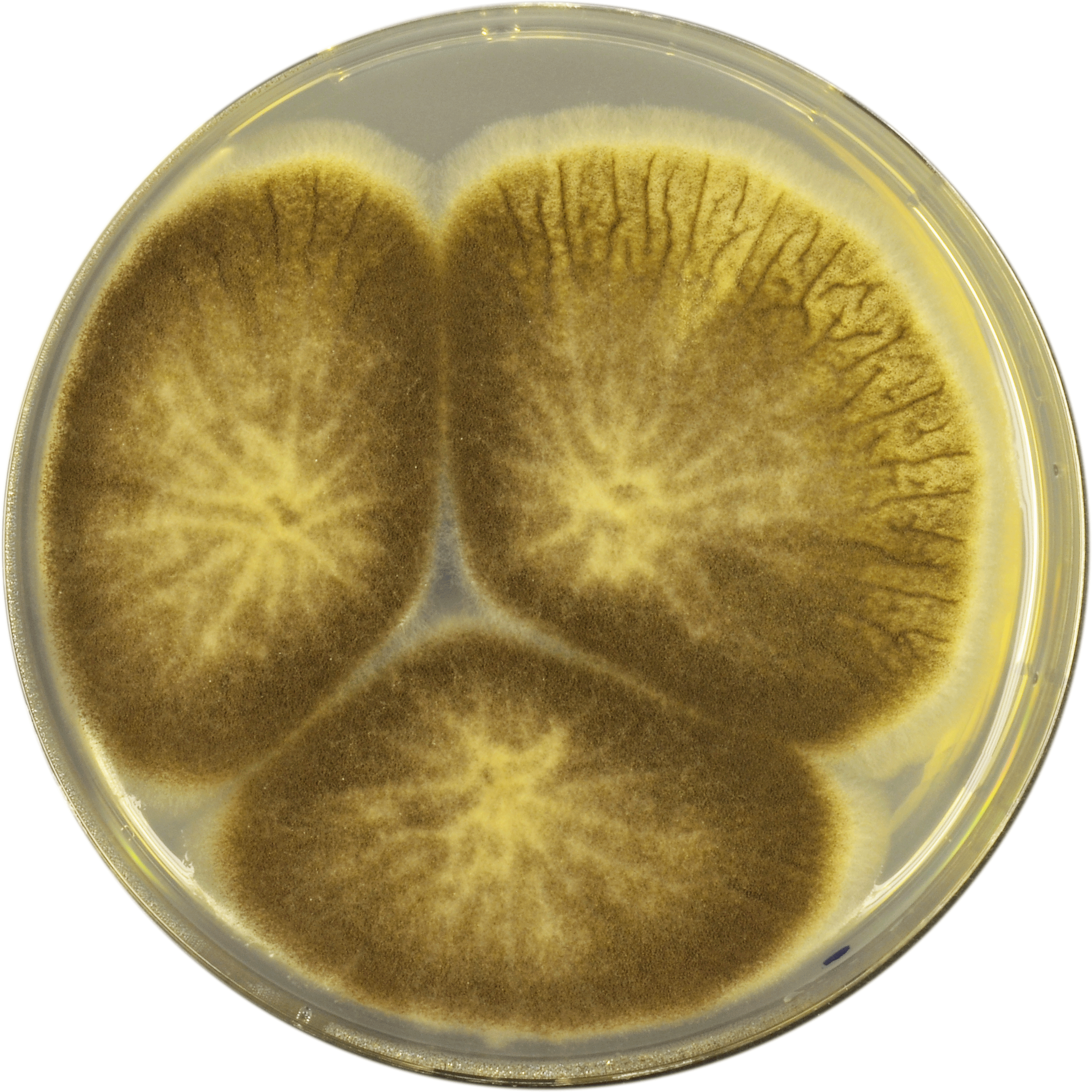
Aspergillus indologenus growing on CYA plate

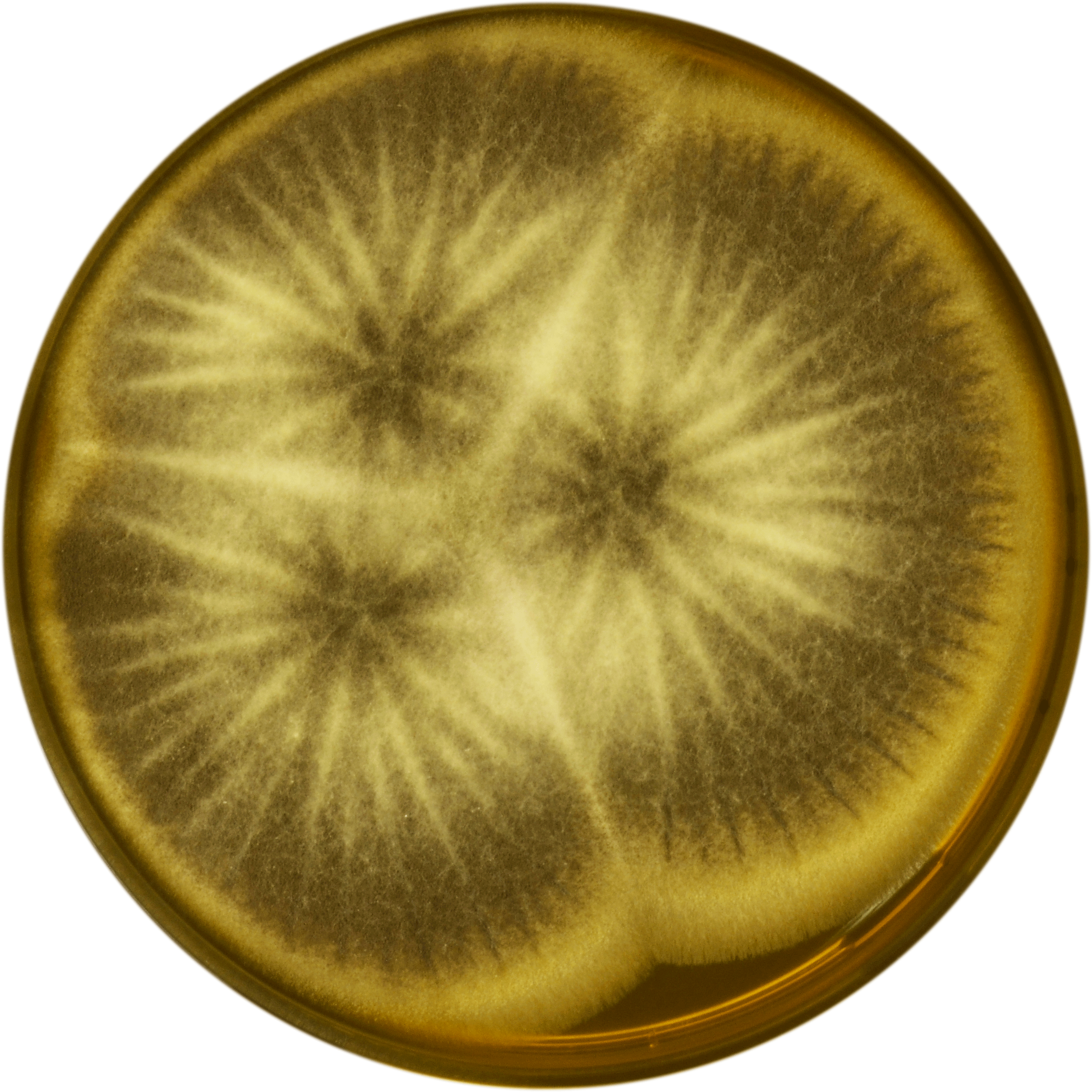
Aspergillus indologenus growing on MEAOX plate
