= Aspergillus cumulatus =

Scientific classification
- Kingdom: Fungi
- Division: Ascomycota
- Class: Eurotiomycetes
- Order: Eurotiales
- Family: Aspergillaceae
- Genus: Aspergillus
- Species: A. cumulatus

Binomial name
- Aspergillus cumulatus D. Han Kim & S.B. Hong (2014)

Species of fungus

Aspergillus cumulatus is a species of fungus in the genus Aspergillus. It is from the Aspergillus section. The species was first described in 2014. It has been reported to produce auroglaucin, bisanthrons, dihydroauroglaucin, echinulins, emodin, erythroglaucin, flavoglaucin, isoechinulins, neoechinulins, physcion, tetracyclic, and tetrahydroauroglaucin.
