= Aspergillus stromatoides =

Scientific classification
- Kingdom: Fungi
- Division: Ascomycota
- Class: Eurotiomycetes
- Order: Eurotiales
- Family: Aspergillaceae
- Genus: Aspergillus
- Species: A. stromatoides

Binomial name
- Aspergillus stromatoides Raper & Fennell 1965

Type strain
- ATCC 24480, CBS 265.73, IMI 171880, NRRL 4519, NRRL 5501, QM 8944

Synonyms
- Chaetosartorya stromatoides

Species of fungus

Aspergillus stromatoides is a species of fungus in the genus Aspergillus. Aspergillus stromatoides produces Calmodulin inhibitors. Many of the strains of Aspergillus stromatoides have been isolated in Thailand.
