= Aspergillus onikii =

Scientific classification
- Kingdom: Fungi
- Division: Ascomycota
- Class: Eurotiomycetes
- Order: Eurotiales
- Family: Aspergillaceae
- Genus: Aspergillus
- Species: A. onikii

Binomial name
- Aspergillus onikii Okunuki

Species of fungus

Aspergillus onikii is a species of fungus in the genus Aspergillus.
