= Aspergillus villosus =

Scientific classification
- Kingdom: Fungi
- Division: Ascomycota
- Class: Eurotiomycetes
- Order: Eurotiales
- Family: Aspergillaceae
- Genus: Aspergillus
- Species: A. villosus

Binomial name
- Aspergillus villosus Sklenar, S.W. Peterson & Hubka (2017)

Species of fungus

Aspergillus villosus is a species of fungus in the genus Aspergillus. It is from the Robusti section. The species was first described in 2017. It has been isolated in the UK and from a painting in France. It has been reported to produce asperphenamate, indole alkaloid A, and asperphenamate.
