= Aspergillus oerlinghausenensis =

Scientific classification
- Kingdom: Fungi
- Division: Ascomycota
- Class: Eurotiomycetes
- Order: Eurotiales
- Family: Aspergillaceae
- Genus: Aspergillus
- Species: A. oerlinghausenensis

Binomial name
- Aspergillus oerlinghausenensis Houbraken, J; Weig, M; Groß, U; Meijer, M; Bader, O (2015)

Species of fungus

Aspergillus oerlinghausenensis is an anamorph species of fungus in the genus Aspergillus which has been isolated from soil in Germany. It is from the Fumigati section. Several fungi from this section produce heat-resistant ascospores, and the isolates from this section are frequently obtained from locations where natural fires have previously occurred. The species was first described in 2015.

== Growth and morphology ==
A. oerlinghausenensis has been cultivated on both Czapek yeast extract agar (CYA) plates and Malt Extract Agar Oxoid® (MEAOX) plates. The growth morphology of the colonies can be seen in the pictures below.

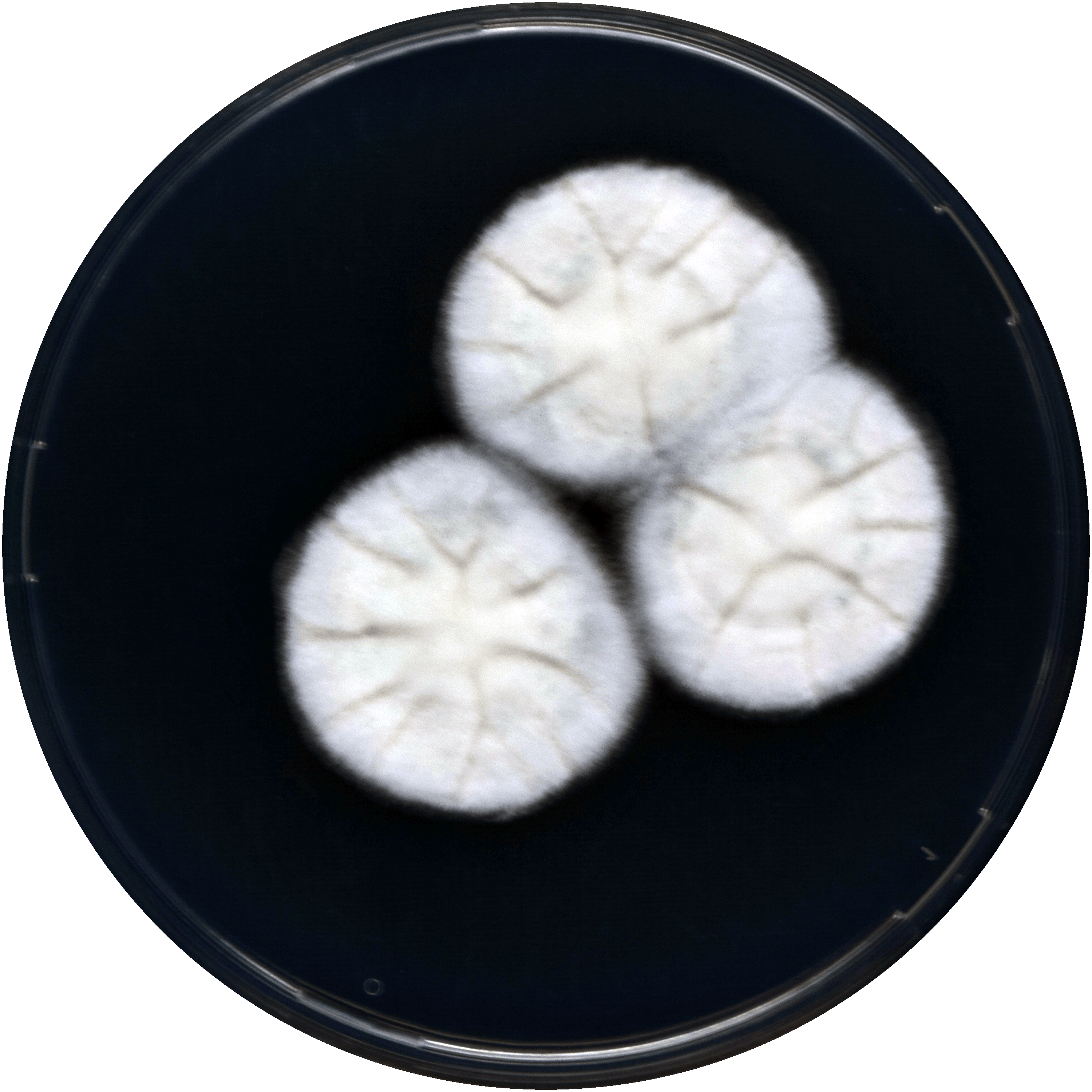
Aspergillus oerlinghausenensis growing on CYA plate

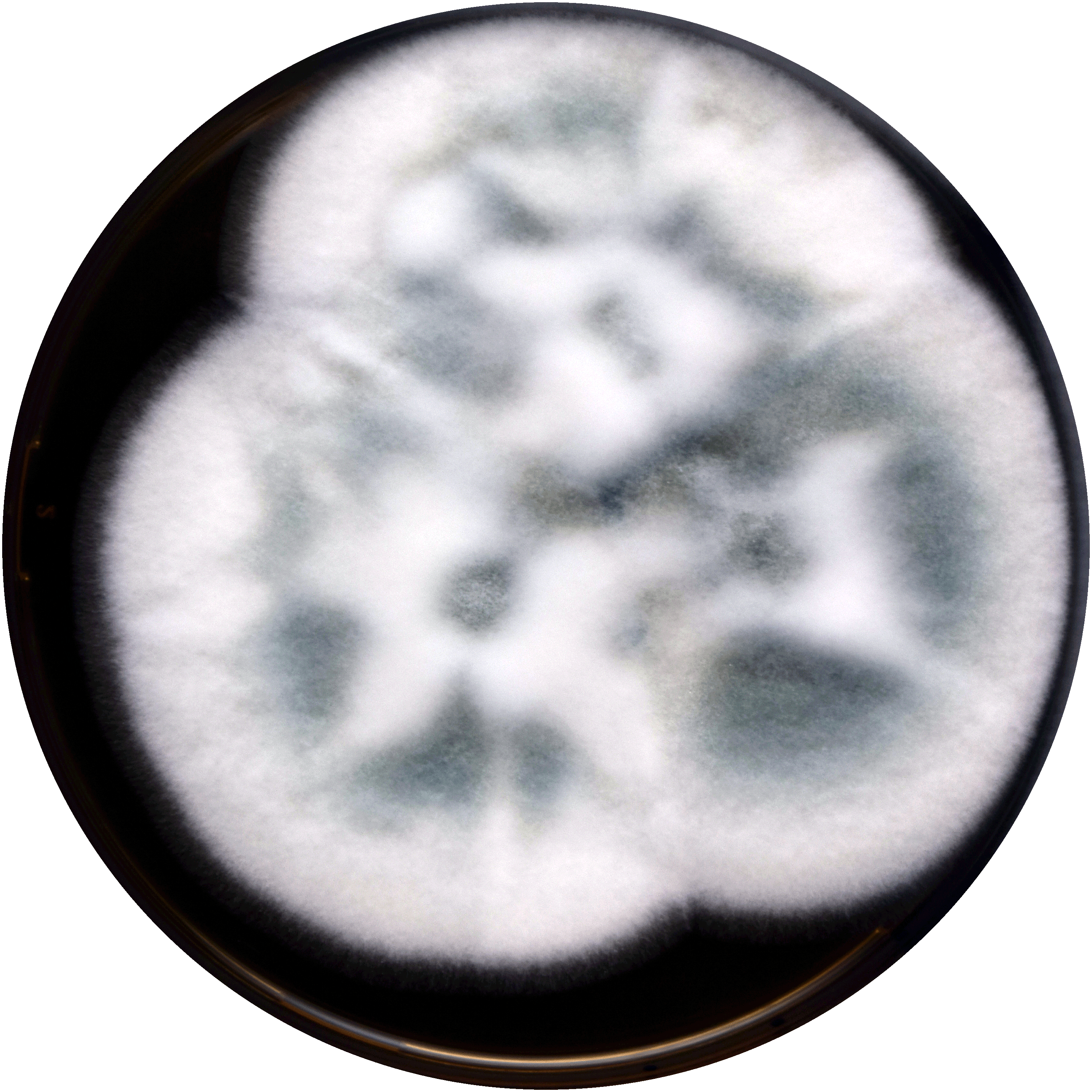
Aspergillus oerlinghausenensis growing on MEAOX plate
