= Aspergillus teporis =

Scientific classification
- Kingdom: Fungi
- Division: Ascomycota
- Class: Eurotiomycetes
- Order: Eurotiales
- Family: Aspergillaceae
- Genus: Aspergillus
- Species: A. teporis

Binomial name
- Aspergillus teporis A.J. Chen, J.C. Frisvad & R.A. Samson (2017)

Species of fungus

Aspergillus teporis is a species of fungus in the genus Aspergillus. It is from the Aspergillus section. The species was first described in 2017. It has been reported to produce echinulins, epiheveadrides, isoechinulins, and neoechinulins.

== Growth and morphology ==
A. teporis has been cultivated on both Czapek yeast extract agar (CYA) plates and Malt Extract Agar Oxoid® (MEAOX) plates. The growth morphology of the colonies can be seen in the pictures below.

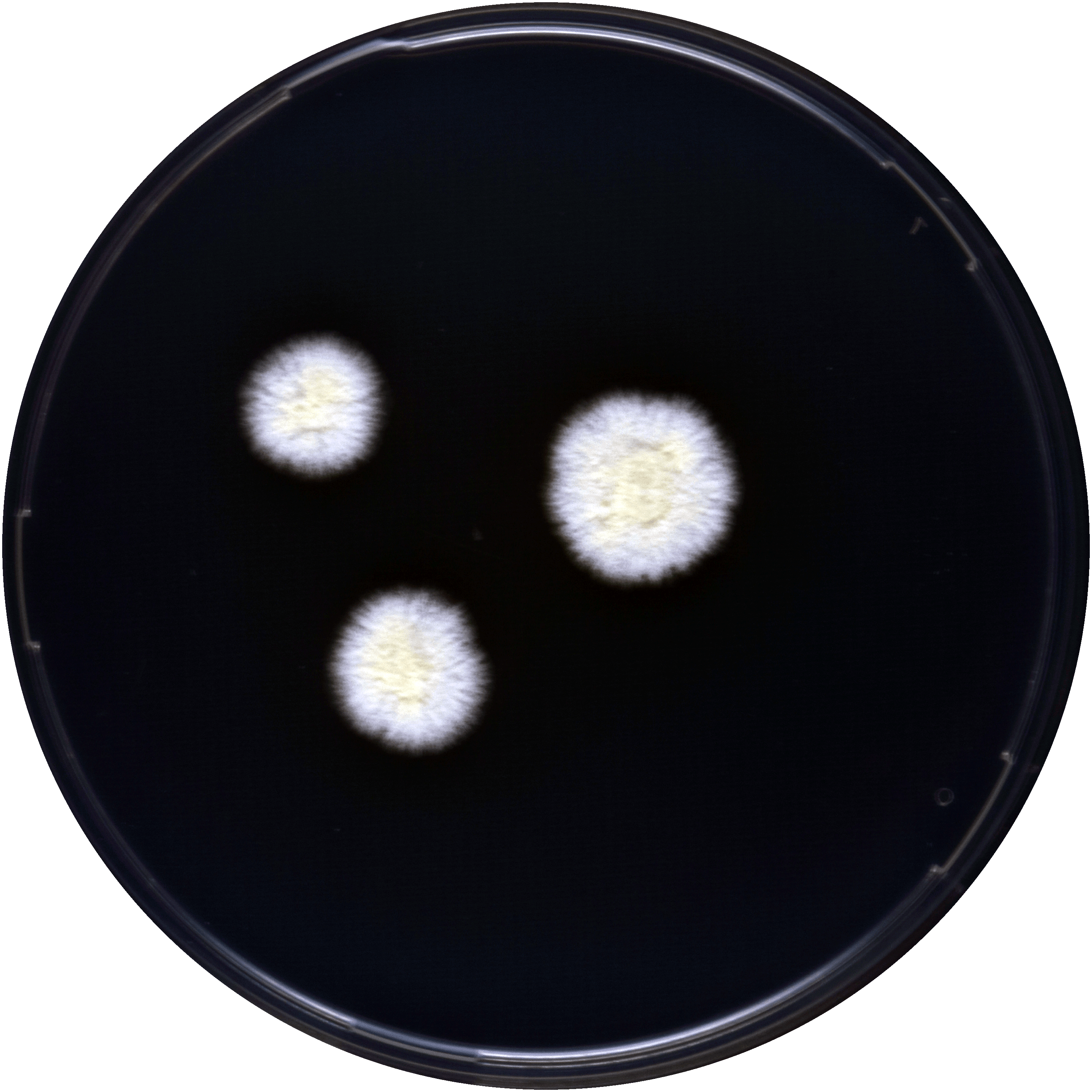
Aspergillus teporis growing on CYA plate

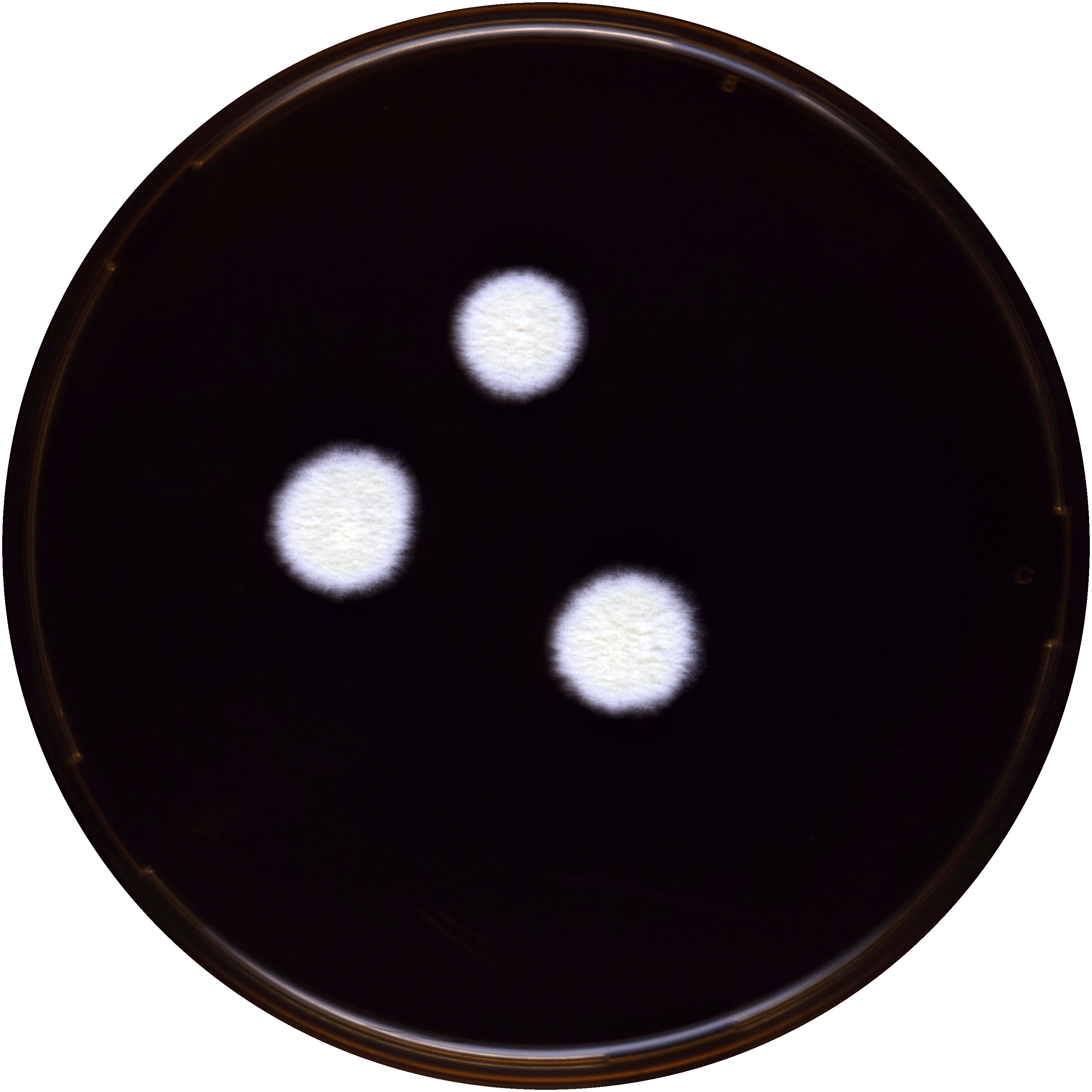
Aspergillus teporis growing on MEAOX plate
