= Aspergillus petrakii =

Scientific classification
- Kingdom: Fungi
- Division: Ascomycota
- Class: Eurotiomycetes
- Order: Eurotiales
- Family: Aspergillaceae
- Genus: Aspergillus
- Species: A. petrakii

Binomial name
- Aspergillus petrakii Vörös-Felkai (1957)

Species of fungus

Aspergillus petrakii is a species of fungus in the genus Aspergillus. It is from the Circumdati section. The species was first described in 1957.

== Growth and morphology ==
A. petrakii has been cultivated on both Czapek yeast extract agar (CYA) plates and Malt Extract Agar Oxoid® (MEAOX) plates. The growth morphology of the colonies can be seen in the pictures below.

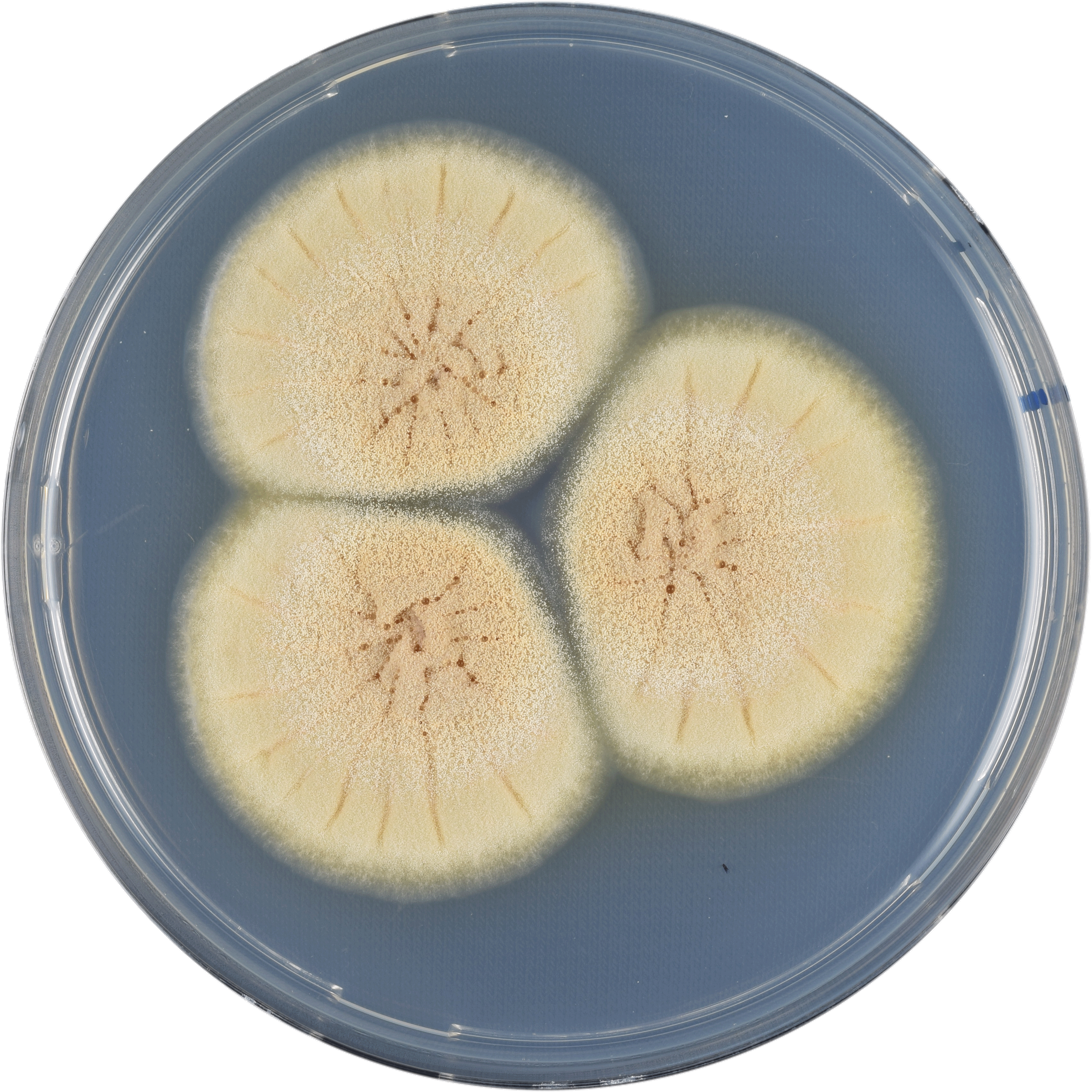
Aspergillus petrakii growing on CYA plate

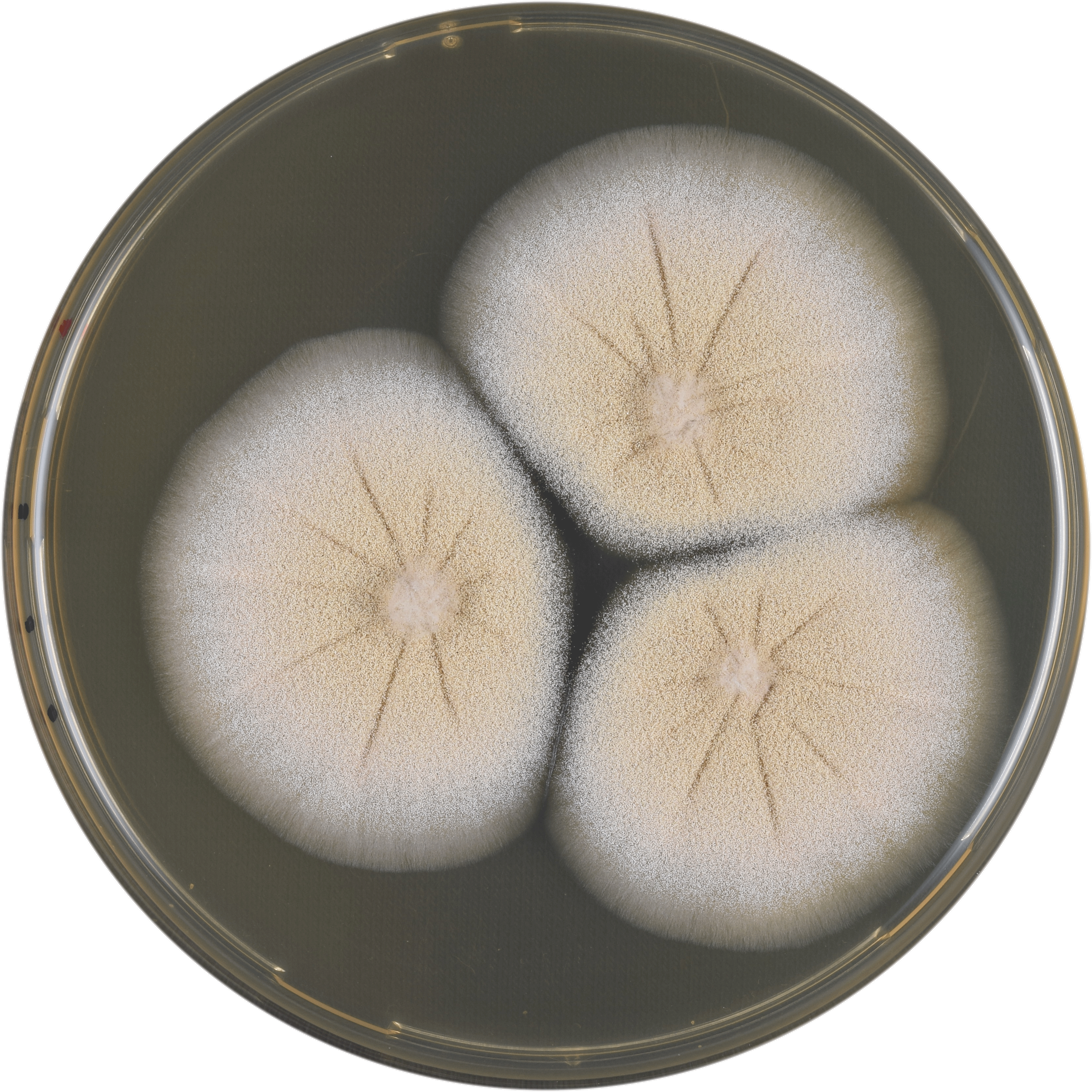
Aspergillus petrakii growing on MEAOX plate
