= Aspergillus zonatus =

Scientific classification
- Kingdom: Fungi
- Division: Ascomycota
- Class: Eurotiomycetes
- Order: Eurotiales
- Family: Aspergillaceae
- Genus: Aspergillus
- Species: A. zonatus

Binomial name
- Aspergillus zonatus Kwon-Chung & Fennell 1965

Species of fungus

Aspergillus zonatus is a species of fungus in the genus Aspergillus which has been isolated from forest soil in Costa Rica. Aspergillus zonatus produces azonalenin and aszonapyrone A
