= Aspergillus destruens =

Scientific classification
- Kingdom: Fungi
- Division: Ascomycota
- Class: Eurotiomycetes
- Order: Eurotiales
- Family: Aspergillaceae
- Genus: Aspergillus
- Species: A. destruens

Binomial name
- Aspergillus destruens Zalar, Sklenar, S.W. Peterson & Hubka (2017)

Species of fungus

Aspergillus destruens is a species of fungus in the genus Aspergillus. It is from the Robusti section. The species was first described in 2017. It has been isolated from maize seed in the United States, an oil painting in Slovenia, air in a bakery in Slovenia, surface of cheese in the Netherlands, and indoor air in Hungary. It has been reported to produce asperglaucide.
