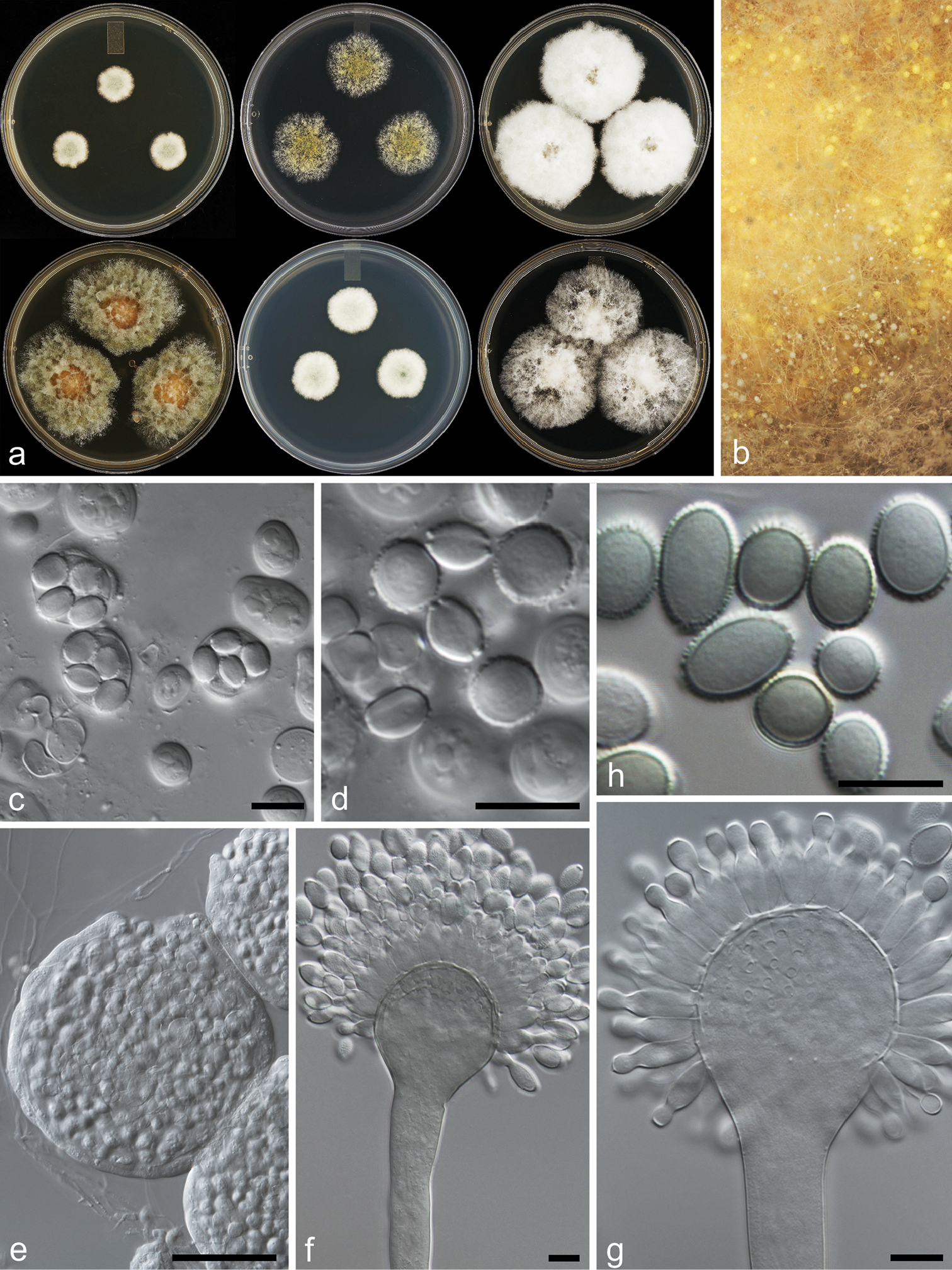
- A. megasporus, click on image for explanation.

Scientific classification
- Kingdom: Fungi
- Division: Ascomycota
- Class: Eurotiomycetes
- Order: Eurotiales
- Family: Aspergillaceae
- Genus: Aspergillus
- Species: A. megasporus

Binomial name
- Aspergillus megasporus C.M. Visagie, N. Yilmaz & K.A. Seifert (2017)

= Aspergillus megasporus =

Species of fungus

Aspergillus megasporus is a species of fungus in the genus Aspergillus. It is from the Aspergillus section. The species was first described in 2017. It has been reported to produce asperflavin, auroglaucin, bisanthrons, dihydroauroglaucin, echinulin, emodin, erythroglaucin, flavoglaucin, isoechinulins, neoechinulins, preechinulin, physcion, quinolactacin (A1, A2, B), tetracyclic, and tetrahydroauroglaucin.

== Growth and morphology ==
Aspergillus megasporus has been cultivated on both yeast extract sucrose agar (YES) plates and Malt Extract Agar Oxoid® (MEAOX) plates. The growth morphology of the colonies can be seen in the pictures below.

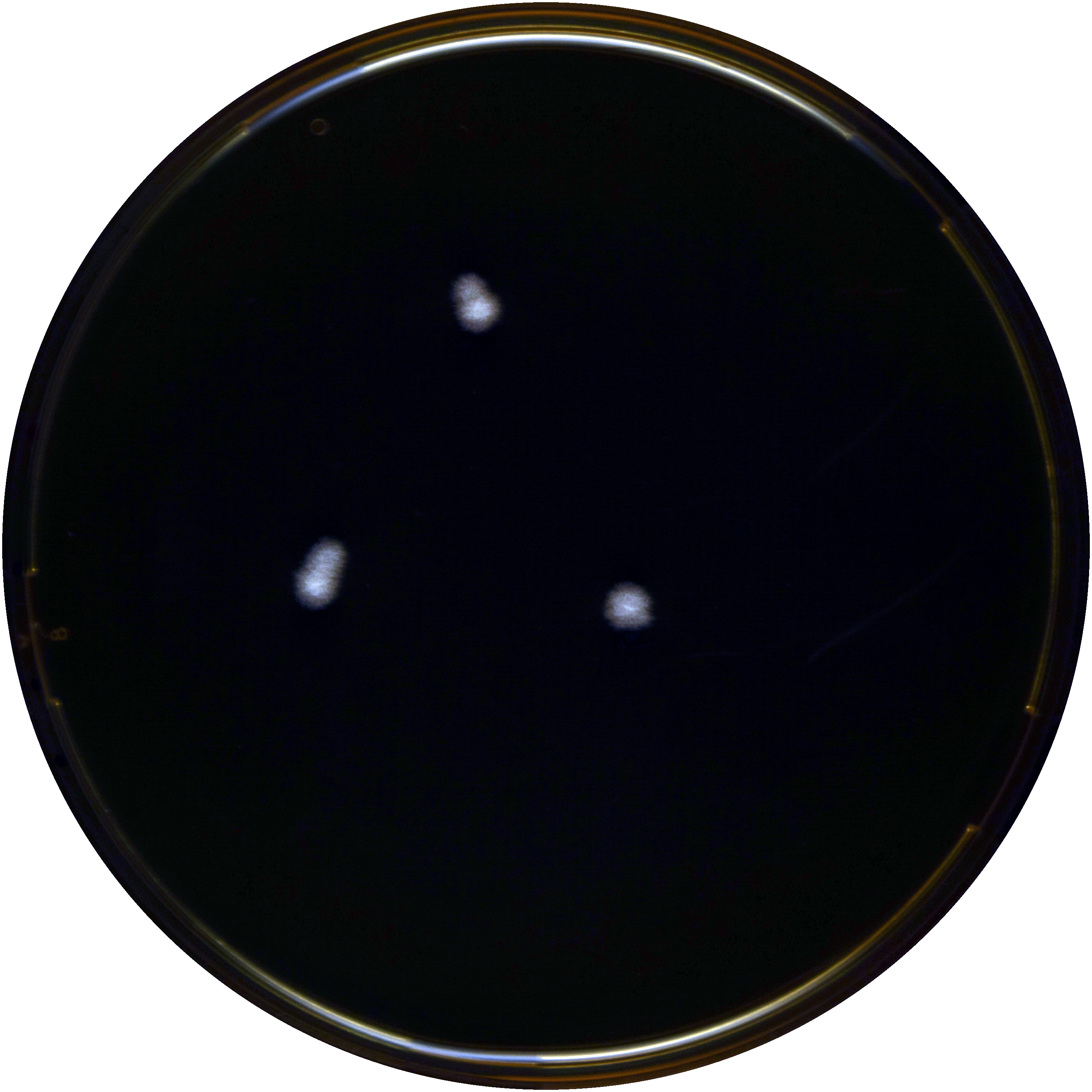
Aspergillus megasporus growing on MEAOX plate

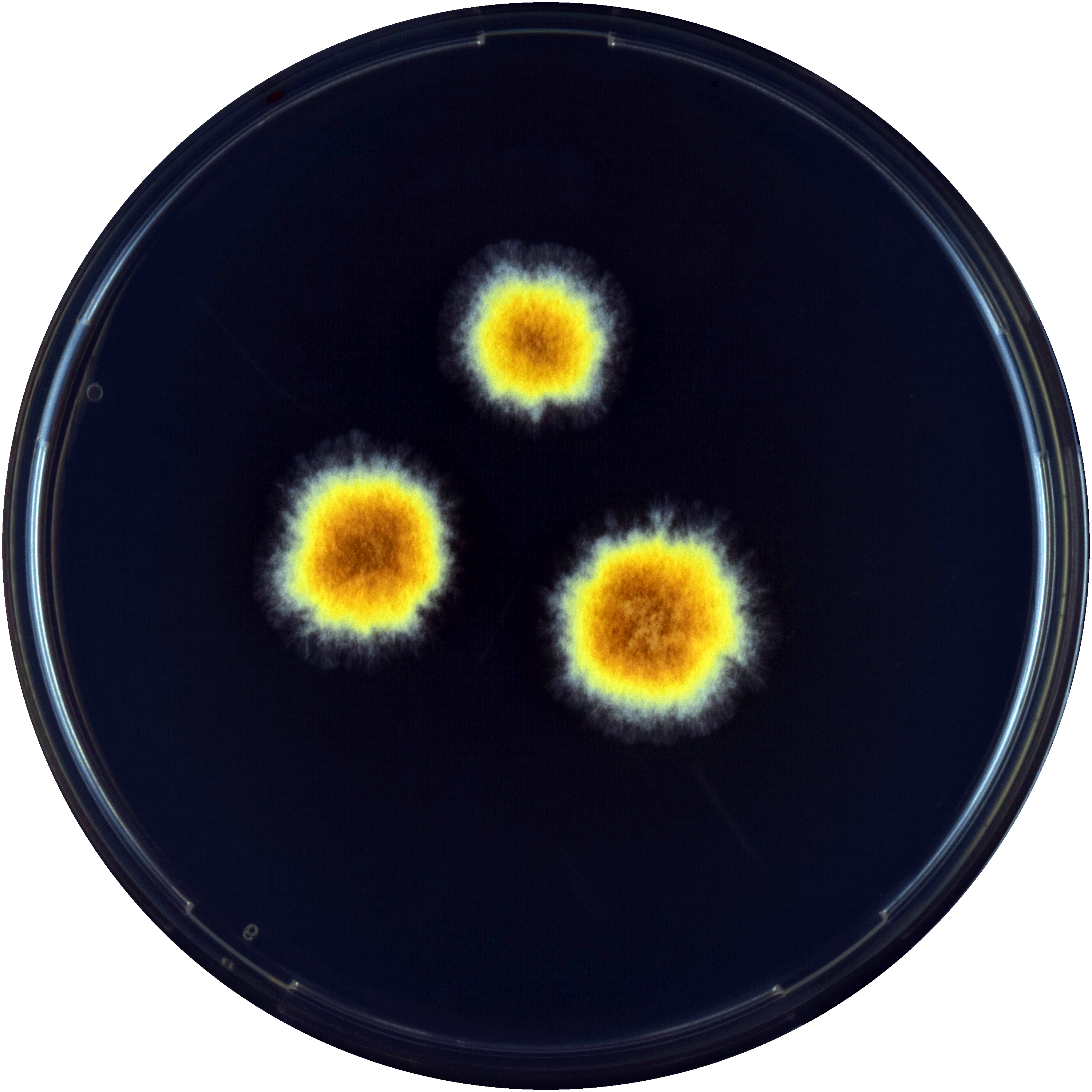
Aspergillus megasporus growing on YES plate
