= Aspergillus brunneoviolaceus =

Scientific classification
- Kingdom: Fungi
- Division: Ascomycota
- Class: Eurotiomycetes
- Order: Eurotiales
- Family: Aspergillaceae
- Genus: Aspergillus
- Species: A. brunneoviolaceus

Binomial name
- Aspergillus brunneoviolaceus Bat. & H. Maia 1955

Type strain
- CCF 108, CBS 621.78, IMI 312981, NRRL 4912, WB 4912

Synonyms
- Aspergillus japonicus, Aspergillus japonicus var. capillatus, Aspergillus atroviolaceus

Species of fungus

Aspergillus brunneoviolaceus is a species of fungus in the genus Aspergillus. It belongs to the group of black Aspergilli which are important industrial workhorses. A. brunneoviolaceus belongs to the Nigri section. The species was first described in 1955 and has been found in Brazil.

The genome of A. brunneoviolaceus was sequenced and published in 2014 as part of the Aspergillus whole-genome sequencing project – a project dedicated to performing whole-genome sequencing of all members of the genus Aspergillus. The genome assembly size was 37.48 Mbp.

== Growth and morphology ==
A. brunneoviolaceus has been cultivated on both Czapek yeast extract agar (CYA) plates and Malt Extract Agar Oxoid® (MEAOX) plates. The growth morphology of the colonies can be seen in the pictures below.

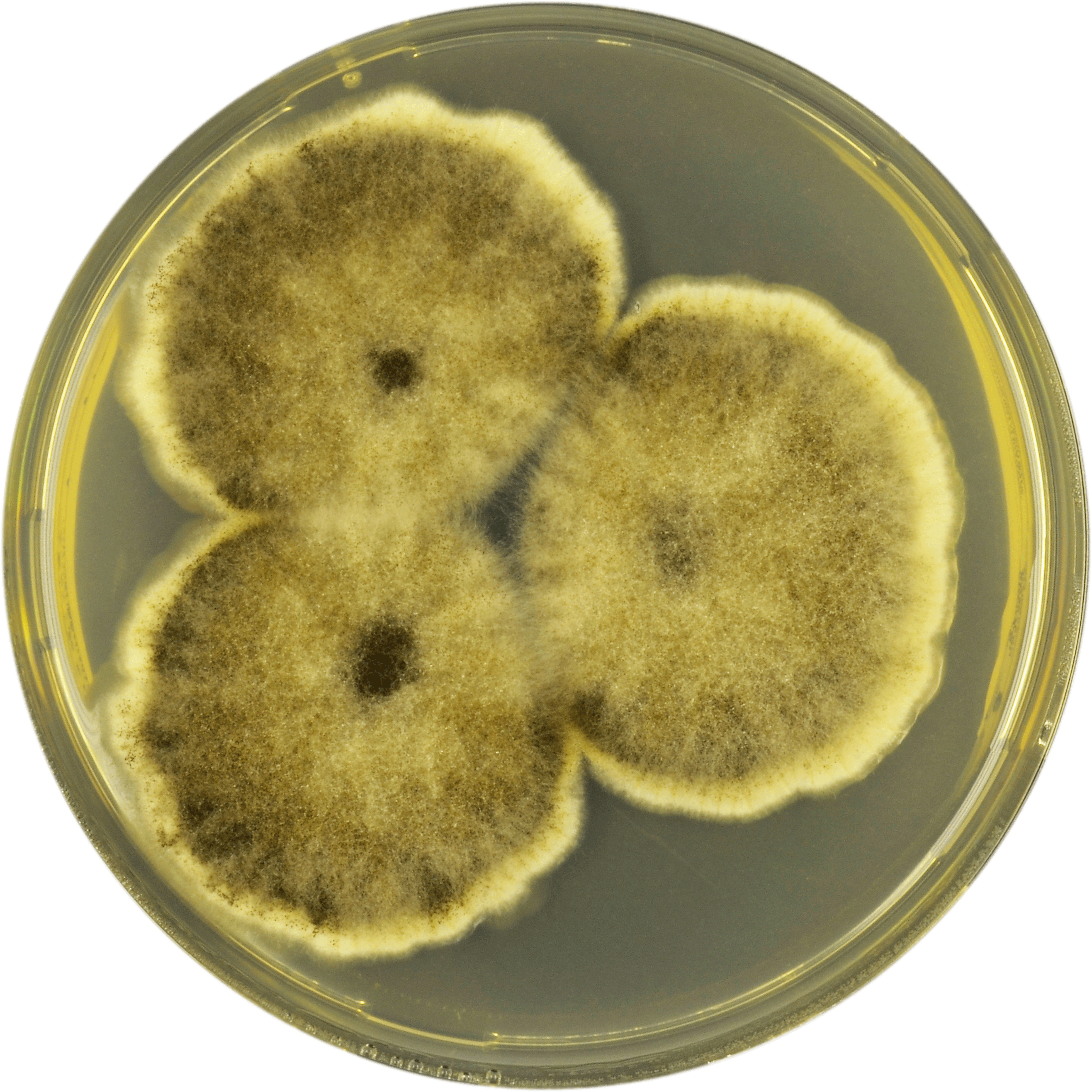
Aspergillus brunneoviolaceus growing on CYA plate

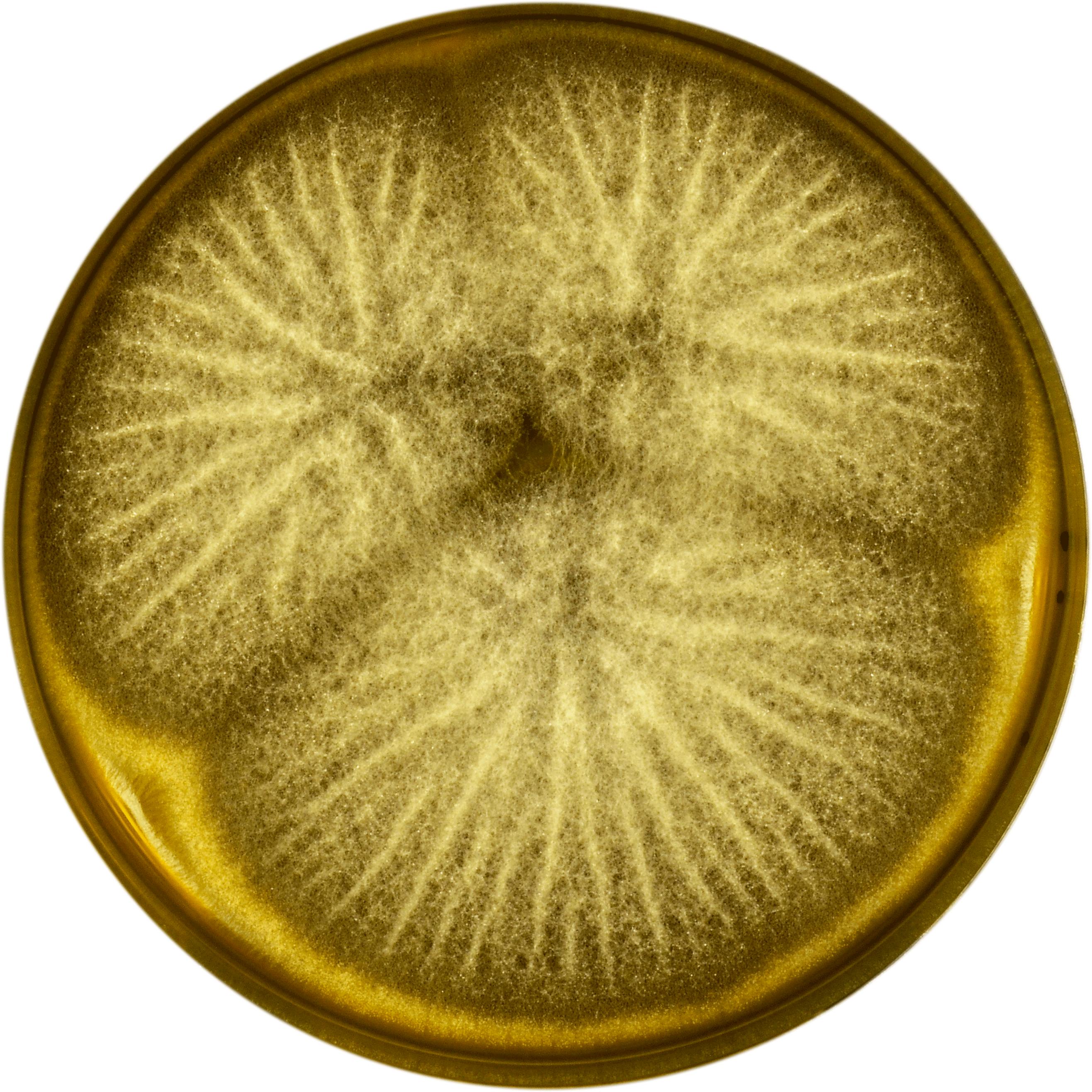
Aspergillus brunneoviolaceus growing on MEAOX plate
