= Aspergillus saccharolyticus =

Scientific classification
- Domain: Eukaryota
- Kingdom: Fungi
- Division: Ascomycota
- Class: Eurotiomycetes
- Order: Eurotiales
- Family: Aspergillaceae
- Genus: Aspergillus
- Species: A. saccharolyticus

Binomial name
- Aspergillus saccharolyticus A. Sørensen, P. Lübeck & Frisvad 2011

Type strain
- AS-2011, CBS 127449, IBT 28509

Species of fungus

Aspergillus saccharolyticus is a species of fungus in the genus Aspergillus. It belongs to the group of black Aspergilli which are important industrial workhorses. A. saccharolyticus belongs to the Nigri section. The species was first described in 2008. It was isolated from under a wooden toilet seat in Denmark. The genome of A. sclerotiicarbonarius was sequenced and published in 2014 as part of the Aspergillus whole-genome sequencing project – a project dedicated to performing whole-genome sequencing of all members of the genus Aspergillus. The genome assembly size was 37.62 Mbp.

== Growth and morphology ==
A. saccharolyticus has been cultivated on both Czapek yeast extract agar (CYA) plates and Malt Extract Agar Oxoid® (MEAOX) plates. The growth morphology of the colonies can be seen in the pictures below.

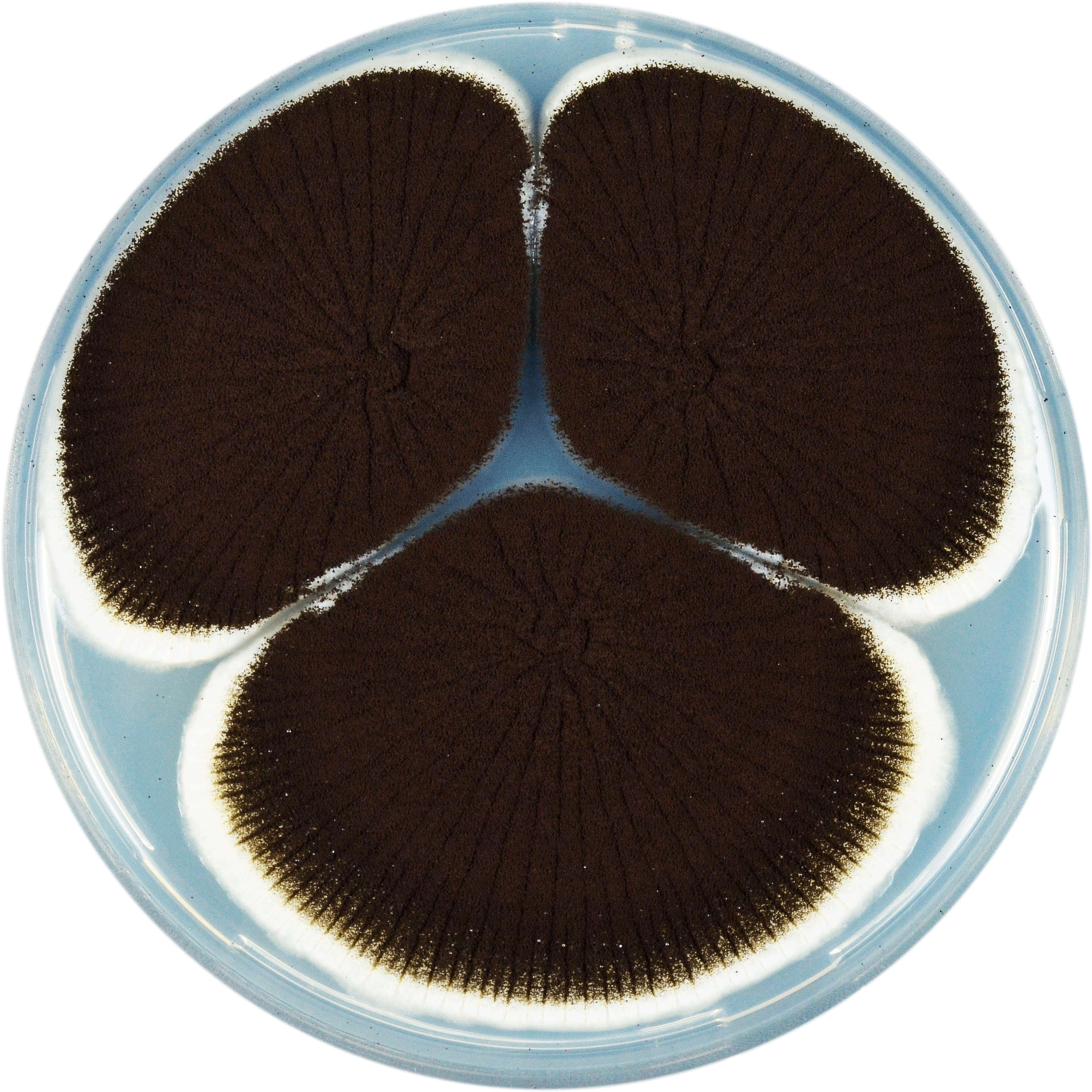
Aspergillus saccharolyticus growing on CYA plate

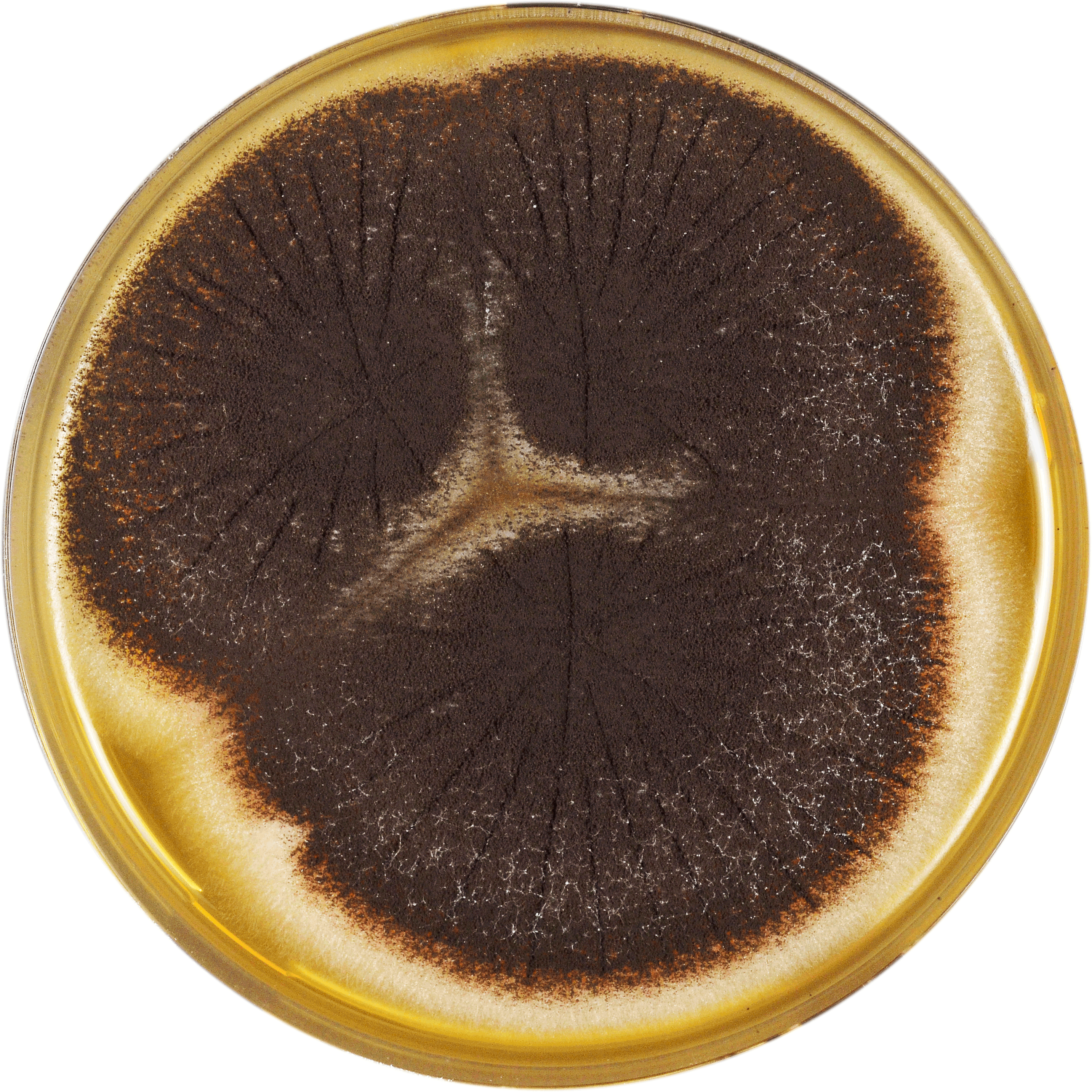
Aspergillus saccharolyticus growing on MEAOX plate
