= Aspergillus appendiculatus =

Scientific classification
- Kingdom: Fungi
- Division: Ascomycota
- Class: Eurotiomycetes
- Order: Eurotiales
- Family: Aspergillaceae
- Genus: Aspergillus
- Species: A. appendiculatus

Binomial name
- Aspergillus appendiculatus Blaser (1975)

Type strain
- ATCC 16444, CBS 374.75, CBS 523.65, ETH 8286, IMI 278374, IMI 89278, ZT 8286

Synonyms
- Eurotium appendiculatum, Eurotium aridicola

Species of fungus

Aspergillus appendiculatus (also called A. testaceocolorans) is a species of fungus in the genus Aspergillus. It is from the Aspergillus section. The species was first described in 1975. It has been reported to produce asperflavin, auroglaucin, bisanthrons, dihydroauroglaucin, echinulins, emodin, erythroglaucin, flavoglaucin, isoechinulins, neoechinulins, physcion, questin, questinol, tetracyclic, and tetrahydroauroglaucin.

== Growth and morphology ==
A. appendiculatus has been cultivated on both Czapek yeast extract agar (CYA) plates and Malt Extract Agar Oxoid® (MEAOX) plates. The growth morphology of the colonies can be seen in the pictures below.

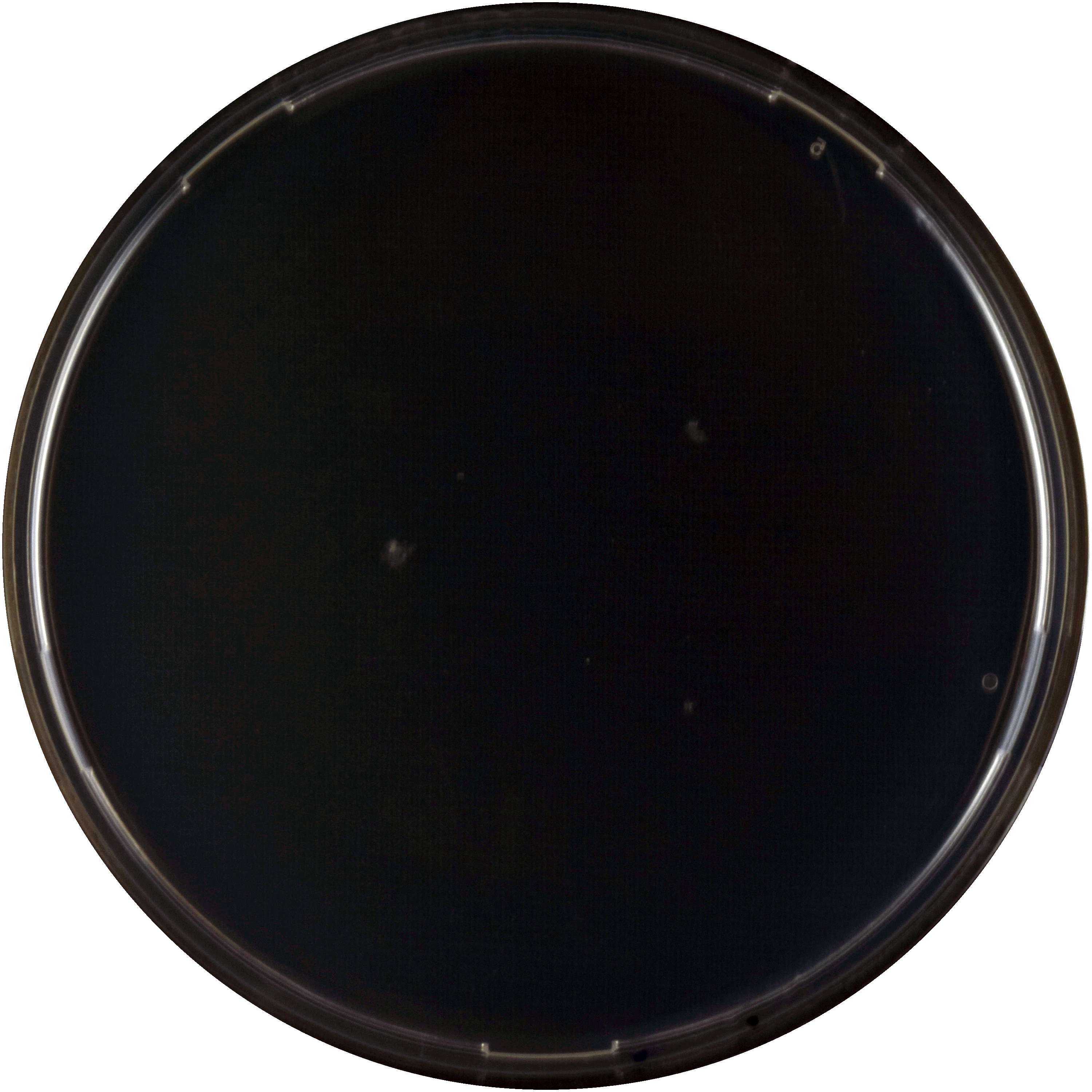
Aspergillus appendiculatus growing on CYA plate

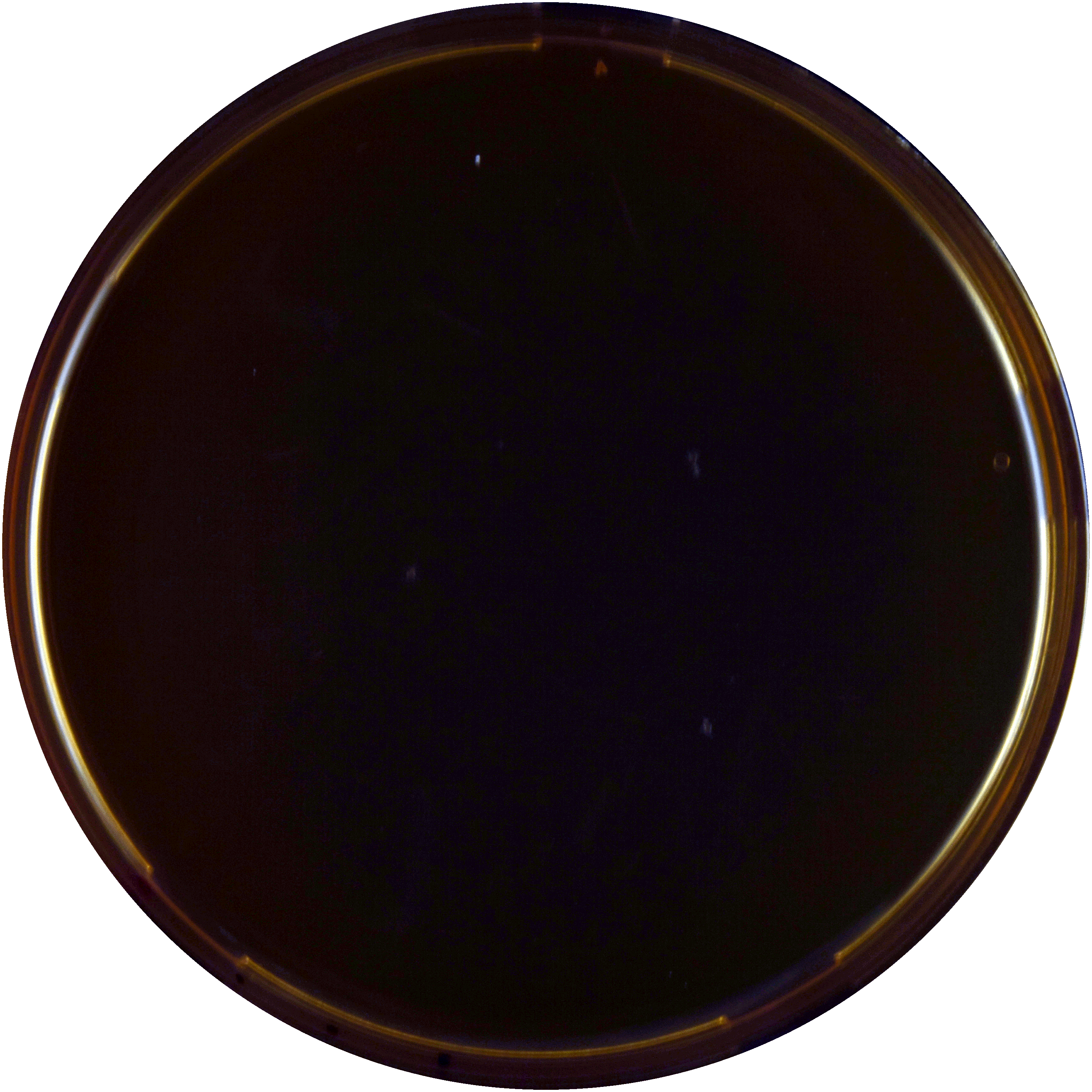
Aspergillus appendiculatus growing on MEAOX plate
