= Aspergillus eucalypticola =

Scientific classification
- Kingdom: Fungi
- Division: Ascomycota
- Class: Eurotiomycetes
- Order: Eurotiales
- Family: Aspergillaceae
- Genus: Aspergillus
- Species: A. eucalypticola

Binomial name
- Aspergillus eucalypticola Frisvad & Samson (2011)

Species of fungus

Aspergillus eucalypticola is a species of fungus in the genus Aspergillus. It belongs to the group of black Aspergilli which are important industrial workhorses. A. eucalypticola belongs to the Nigri section. The species was first described in 2011. A. aculeatinus has been isolated from eucalyptus leaves in Australia, and has been shown to produce pyranonigrin A, funalenone, aurasperone B and other naphtho-γ-pyrones.

The genome of A. eucalypticola was sequenced and published in 2014 as part of the Aspergillus whole-genome sequencing project – a project dedicated to performing whole-genome sequencing of all members of the Aspergillus genus. The genome assembly size was 34.79 Mbp.

== Growth and morphology ==
Aspergillus eucalypticola has been cultivated on both Czapek yeast extract agar (CYA) plates and Malt Extract Agar Oxoid® (MEAOX) plates. The growth morphology of the colonies can be seen in the pictures below.

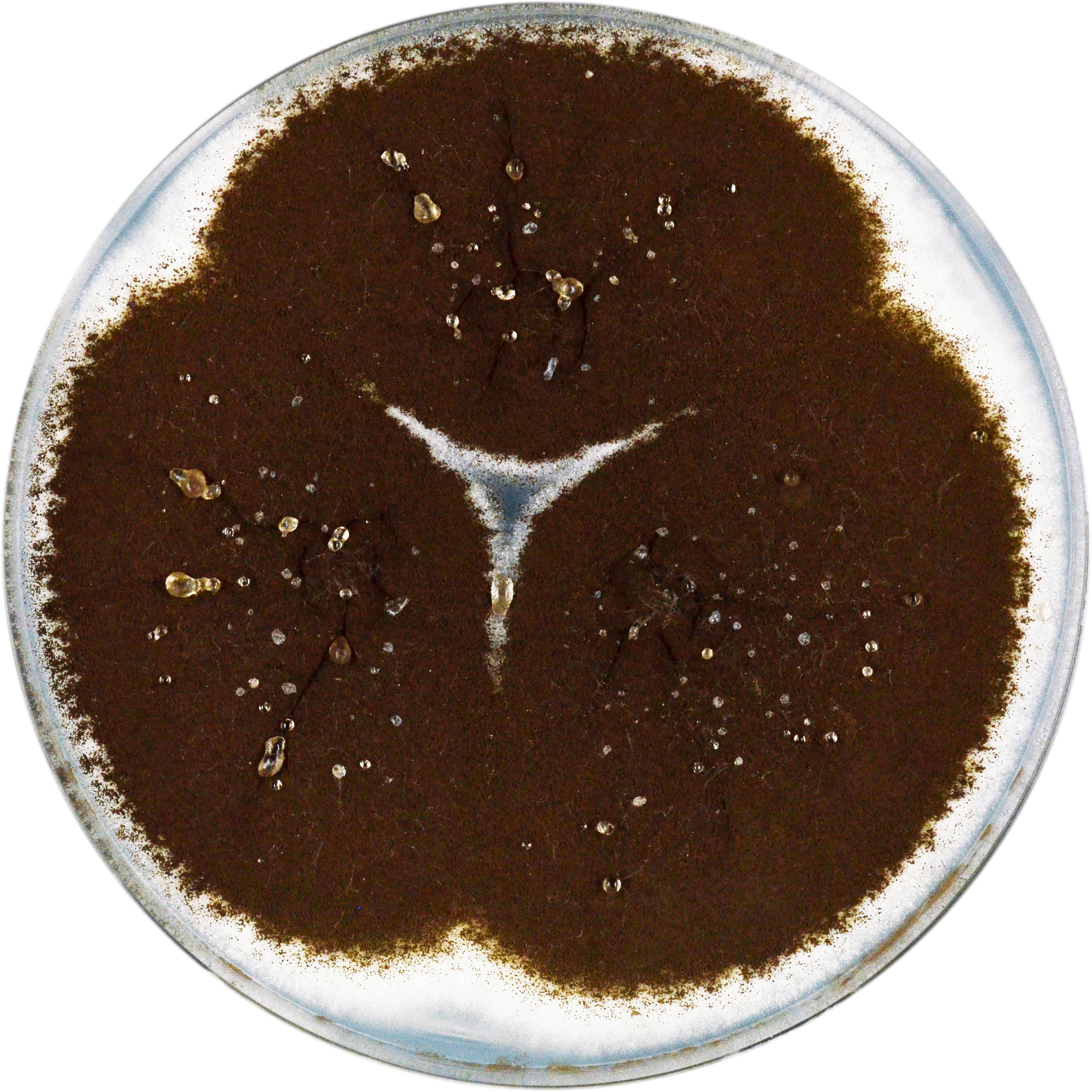
Aspergillus eucalypticola growing on CYA plate

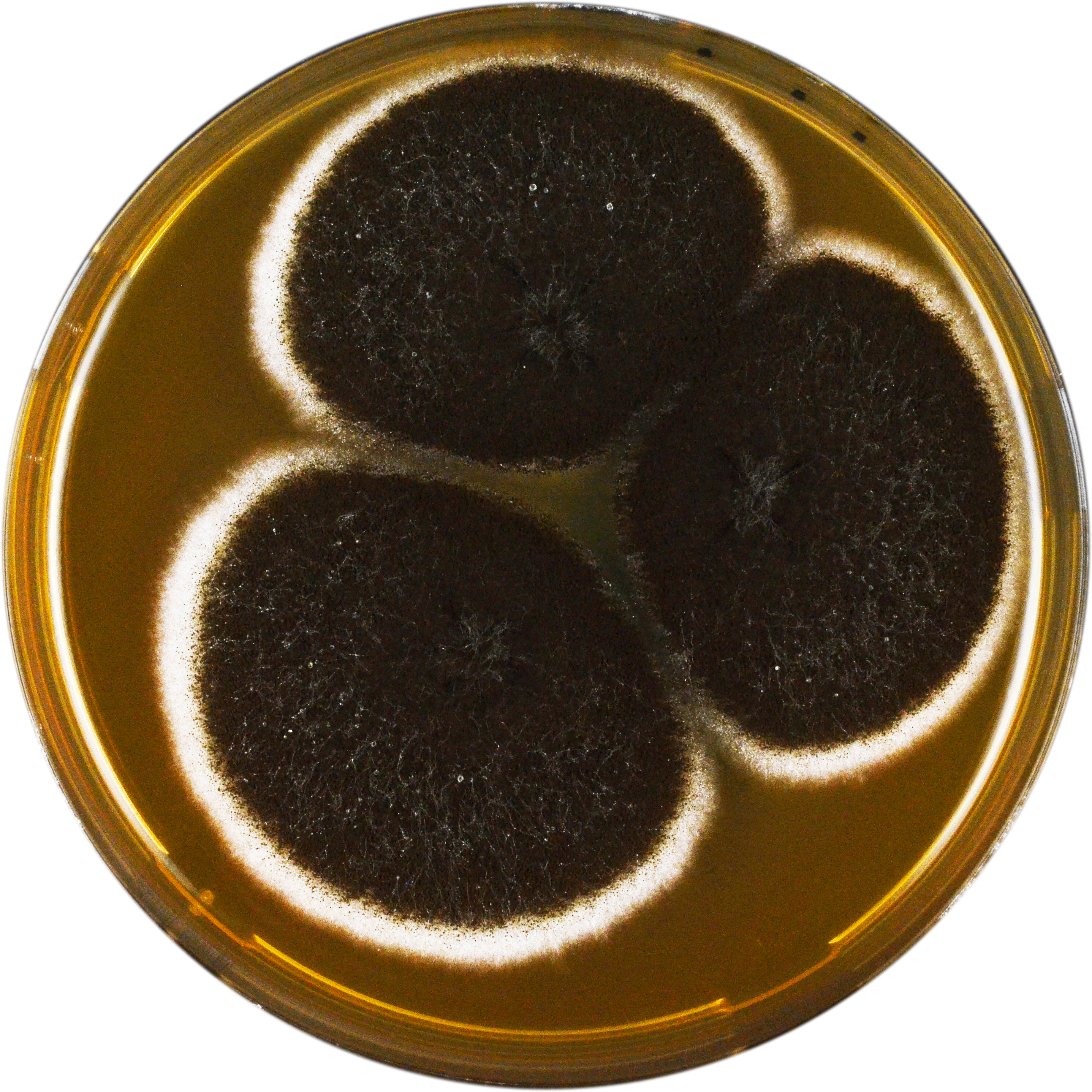
Aspergillus eucalypticola growing on MEAOX plate
