= Aspergillus fijiensis =

Scientific classification
- Kingdom: Fungi
- Division: Ascomycota
- Class: Eurotiomycetes
- Order: Eurotiales
- Family: Aspergillaceae
- Genus: Aspergillus
- Species: A. fijiensis

Binomial name
- Aspergillus fijiensis Varga, Frisvad & Samson (2011)

Species of fungus

Aspergillus fijiensis is a species of fungus in the genus Aspergillus. It belongs to the group of black Aspergilli which are important industrial workhorses. A. fijiensis belongs to the Nigri section. The species was first described in 2011. It has been isolated from soil in Fiji and from Lactuca sativa in Indonesia. This species is able to grow at 37 °C, and produces asperparalines and okaramins.

The genome of A. fijiensis was sequenced and published in 2014 as part of the Aspergillus whole-genome sequencing project – a project dedicated to performing whole-genome sequencing of all members of the genus Aspergillus. The genome assembly size was 36.51 Mbp.

== Growth and morphology ==
A. fijiensis has been cultivated on both Czapek yeast extract agar (CYA) plates and Malt Extract Agar Oxoid® (MEAOX) plates. The growth morphology of the colonies can be seen in the pictures below.

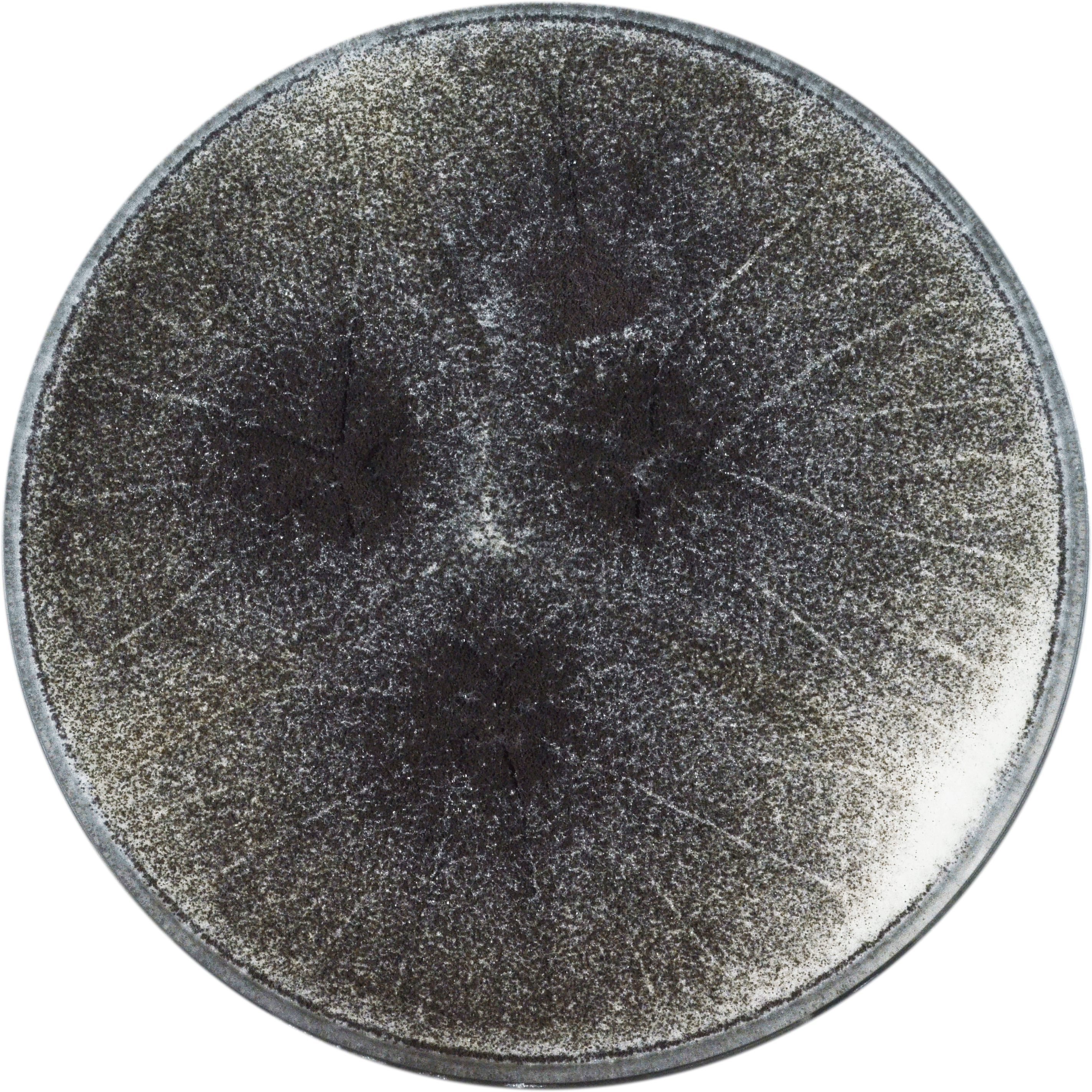
Aspergillus fijiensis growing on CYA plate

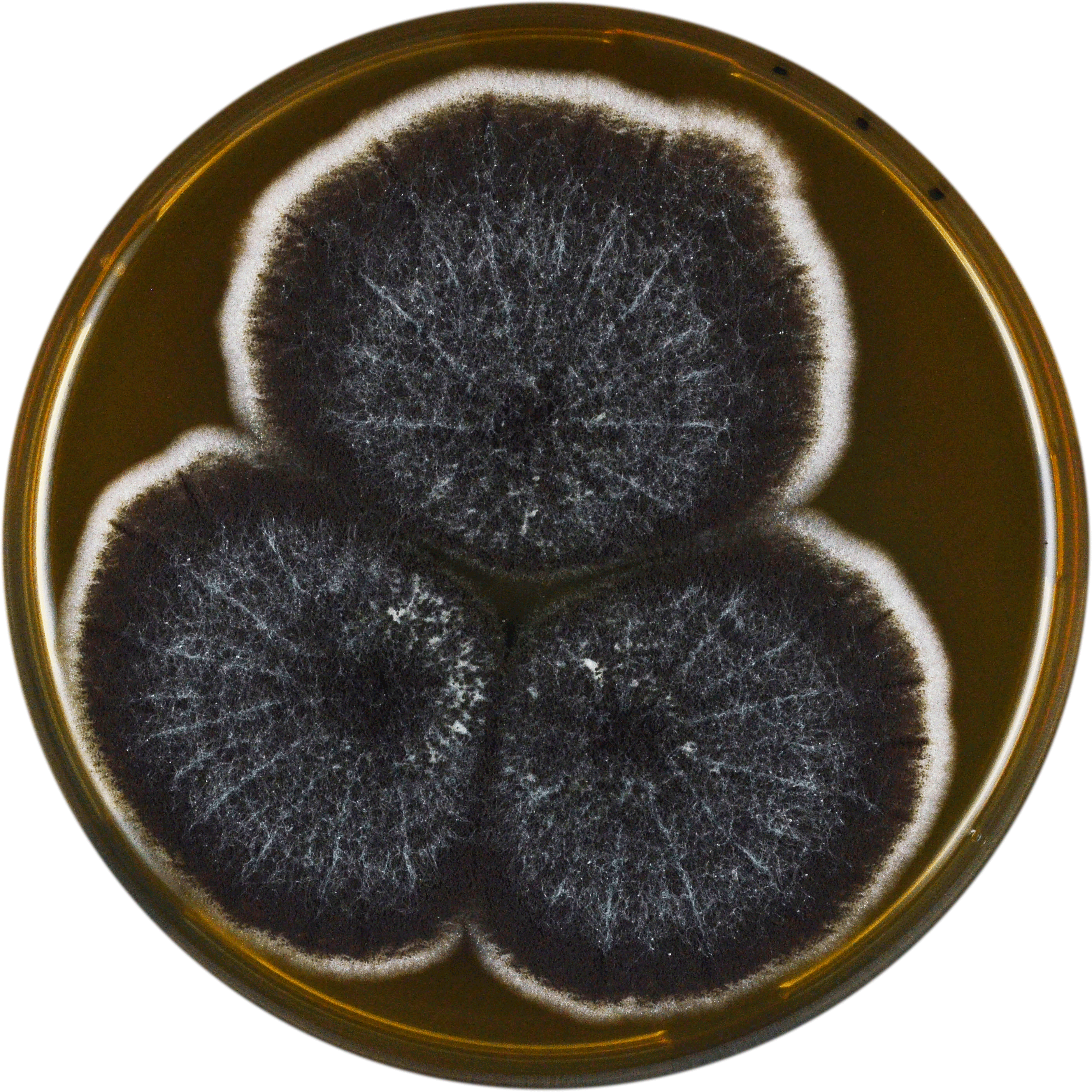
Aspergillus fijiensis growing on MEAOX plate
