= Aspergillus neoniger =

Scientific classification
- Kingdom: Fungi
- Division: Ascomycota
- Class: Eurotiomycetes
- Order: Eurotiales
- Family: Aspergillaceae
- Genus: Aspergillus
- Species: A. neoniger

Binomial name
- Aspergillus neoniger Varga, Frisvad & Samson (2011)

Species of fungus

Aspergillus neoniger is a species of fungus in the genus Aspergillus. It belongs to the group of black Aspergilli which are important industrial workhorses. A. neoniger belongs to the Nigri section. The species was first described in 2011. The species was isolated from desert sand in Namibia and mangrove water in Venezuela. A. neoniger produces aurasperone B and pyranonigrin A.

The genome of A. neoniger was sequenced and published in 2014 as part of the Aspergillus whole-genome sequencing project – a project dedicated to performing whole-genome sequencing of all members of the genus Aspergillus. The genome assembly size was 35.42 Mbp.

== Growth and morphology ==
Aspergillus neoniger has been cultivated on both Czapek yeast extract agar (CYA) plates and Malt Extract Agar Oxoid® (MEAOX) plates. The growth morphology of the colonies can be seen in the pictures below.

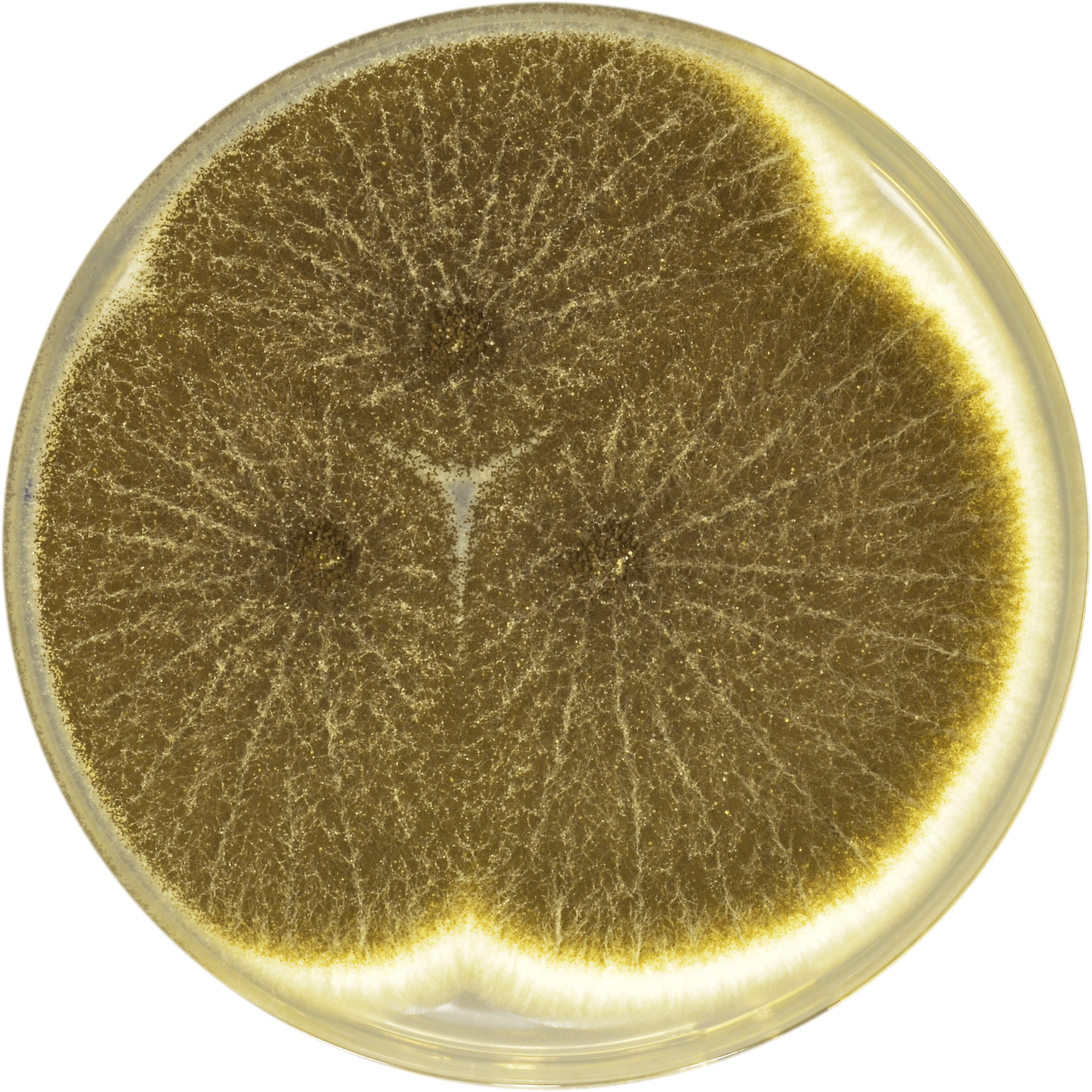
Aspergillus neoniger growing on CYA plate

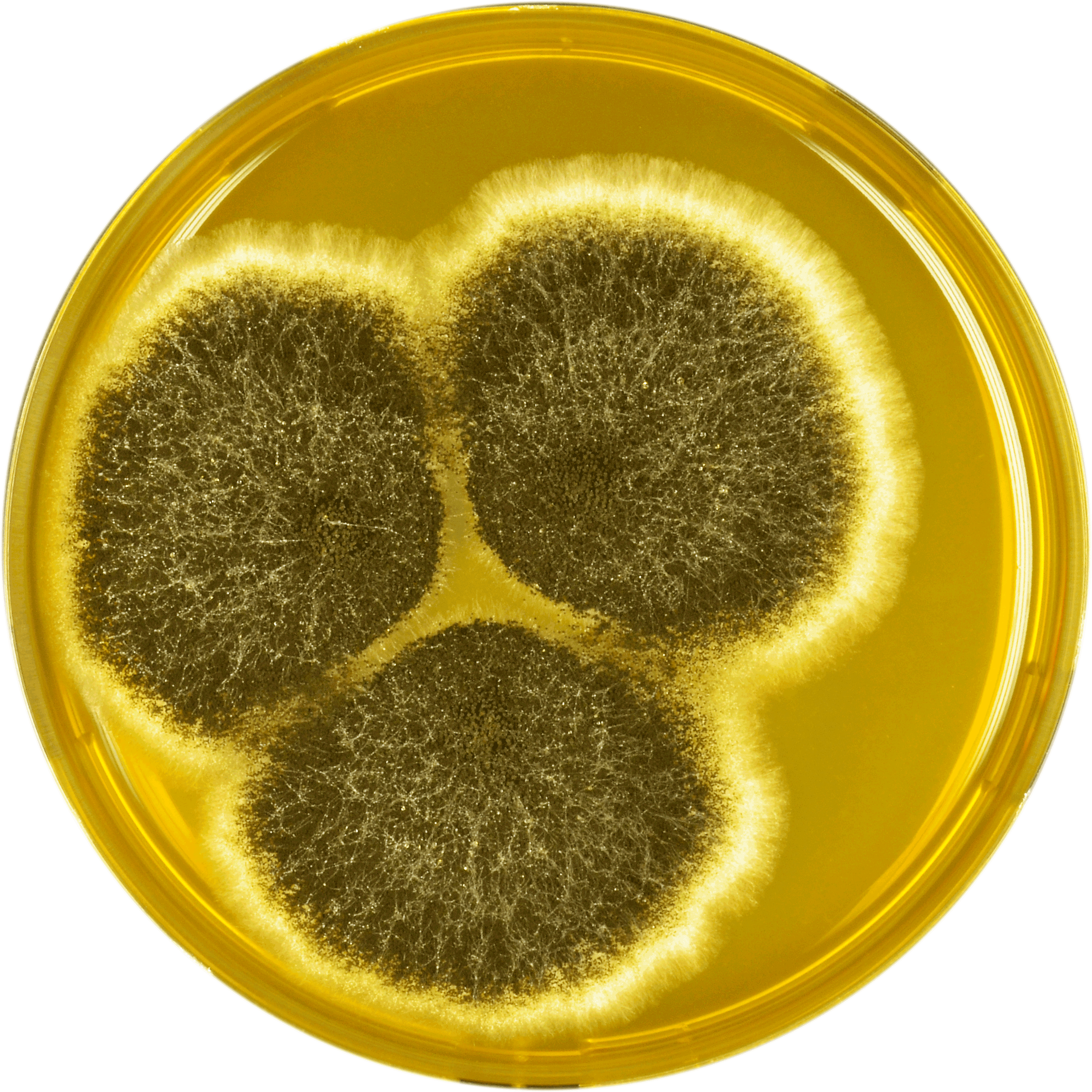
Aspergillus neoniger growing on MEAOX plate
