= Aspergillus vadensis =

Scientific classification
- Kingdom: Fungi
- Division: Ascomycota
- Class: Eurotiomycetes
- Order: Eurotiales
- Family: Aspergillaceae
- Genus: Aspergillus
- Species: A. vadensis

Binomial name
- Aspergillus vadensis de Vries et al. 2007

Species of fungus

Aspergillus vadensis is a species of fungus in the genus Aspergillus. It belongs to the group of black Aspergilli which are important industrial workhorses. A. vadensis belongs to the Nigri section. The species was first described in 2004. It has been found in air in Egypt. It produces the secondary metabolites asperazine and aurasperone A.

The genome of A. vadensis was sequenced and published in 2014 as part of the Aspergillus whole-genome sequencing project – a project dedicated to performing whole-genome sequencing of all members of the genus Aspergillus. The genome assembly size was 35.66 Mbp.

== Growth and morphology ==
A. vadensis has been cultivated on both Czapek yeast extract agar (CYA) plates and Malt Extract Agar Oxoid (MEAOX) plates. The growth morphology of the colonies can be seen in the pictures below.

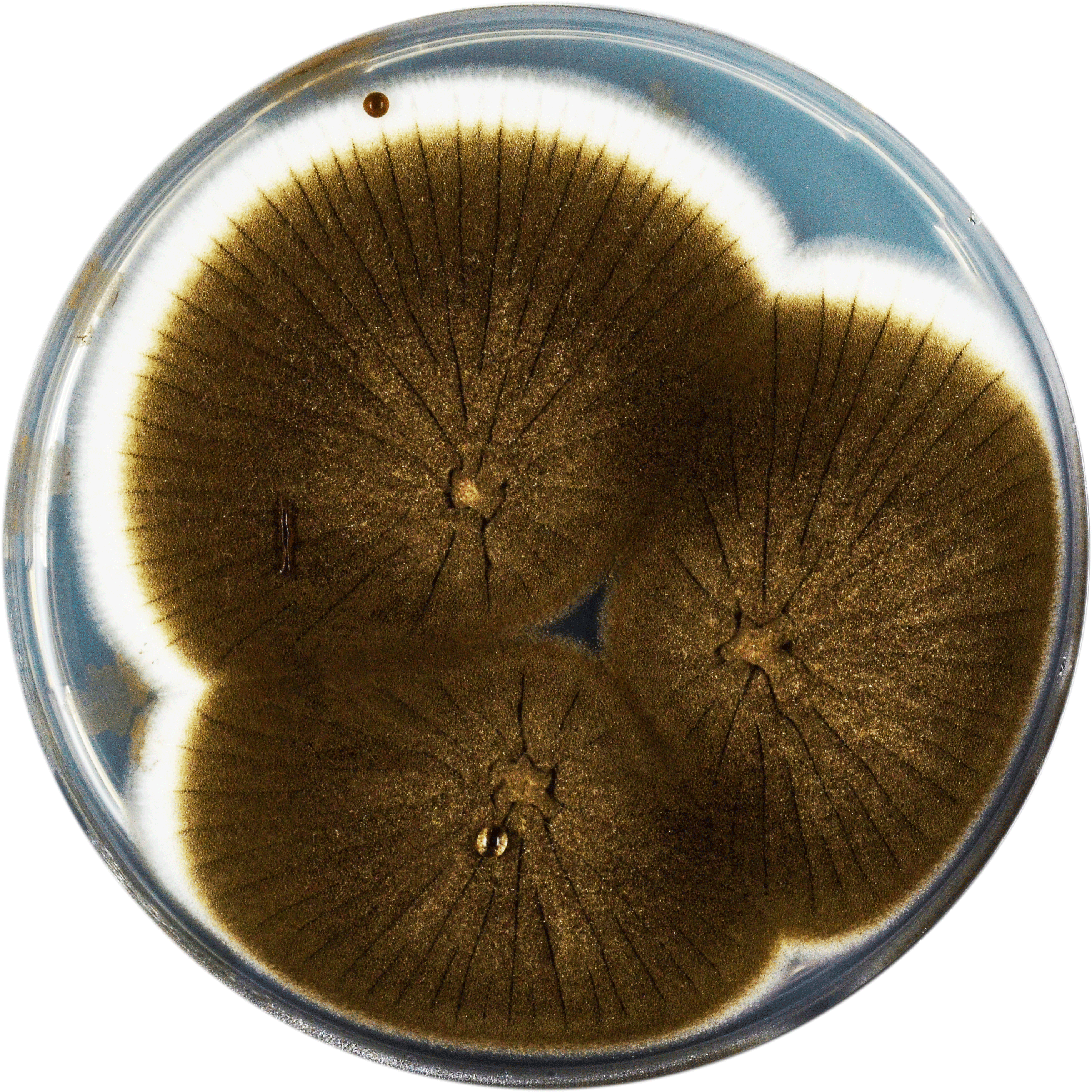
Aspergillus vadensis growing on CYA plate

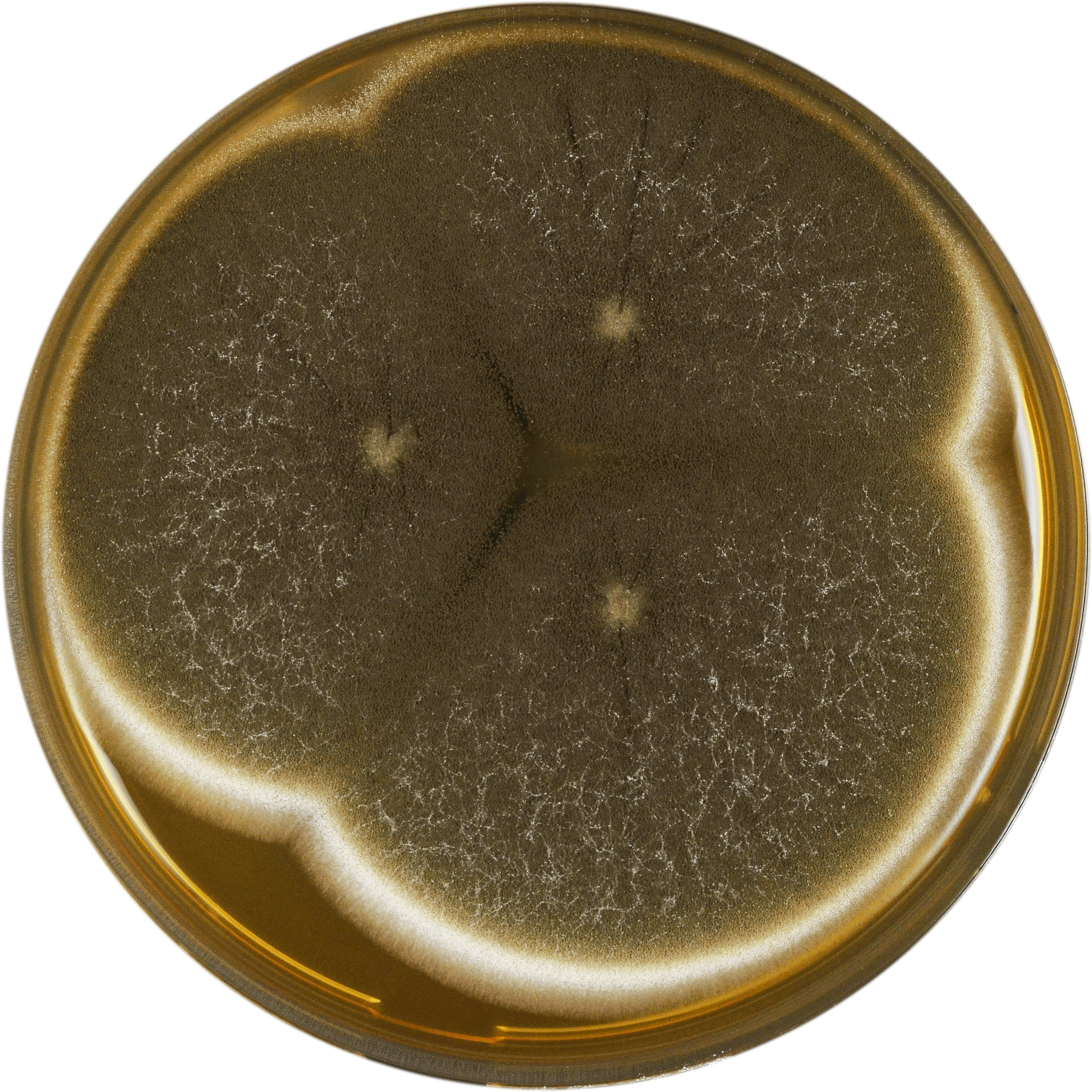
Aspergillus vadensis growing on MEAOX plate
