= Aspergillus neoglaber =

Scientific classification
- Kingdom: Fungi
- Division: Ascomycota
- Class: Eurotiomycetes
- Order: Eurotiales
- Family: Aspergillaceae
- Genus: Aspergillus
- Species: A. neoglaber

Binomial name
- Aspergillus neoglaber Kozakiewicz (1989)

Species of fungus

Aspergillus neoglaber is a species of fungus in the genus Aspergillus. It is from the Fumigati section. Several fungi from this section produce heat-resistant ascospores, and the isolates from this section are frequently obtained from locations where natural fires have previously occurred. The species was first described in 1989. It has been reported to produce asperpentyn, avenaciolide, glabramycin A, B, C, sartoryglabrin A, B, C, and wortmannins.

== Growth and morphology ==
A. neoglaber has been cultivated on both Czapek yeast extract agar (CYA) plates and Malt Extract Agar Oxoid® (MEAOX) plates. The growth morphology of the colonies can be seen in the pictures below.

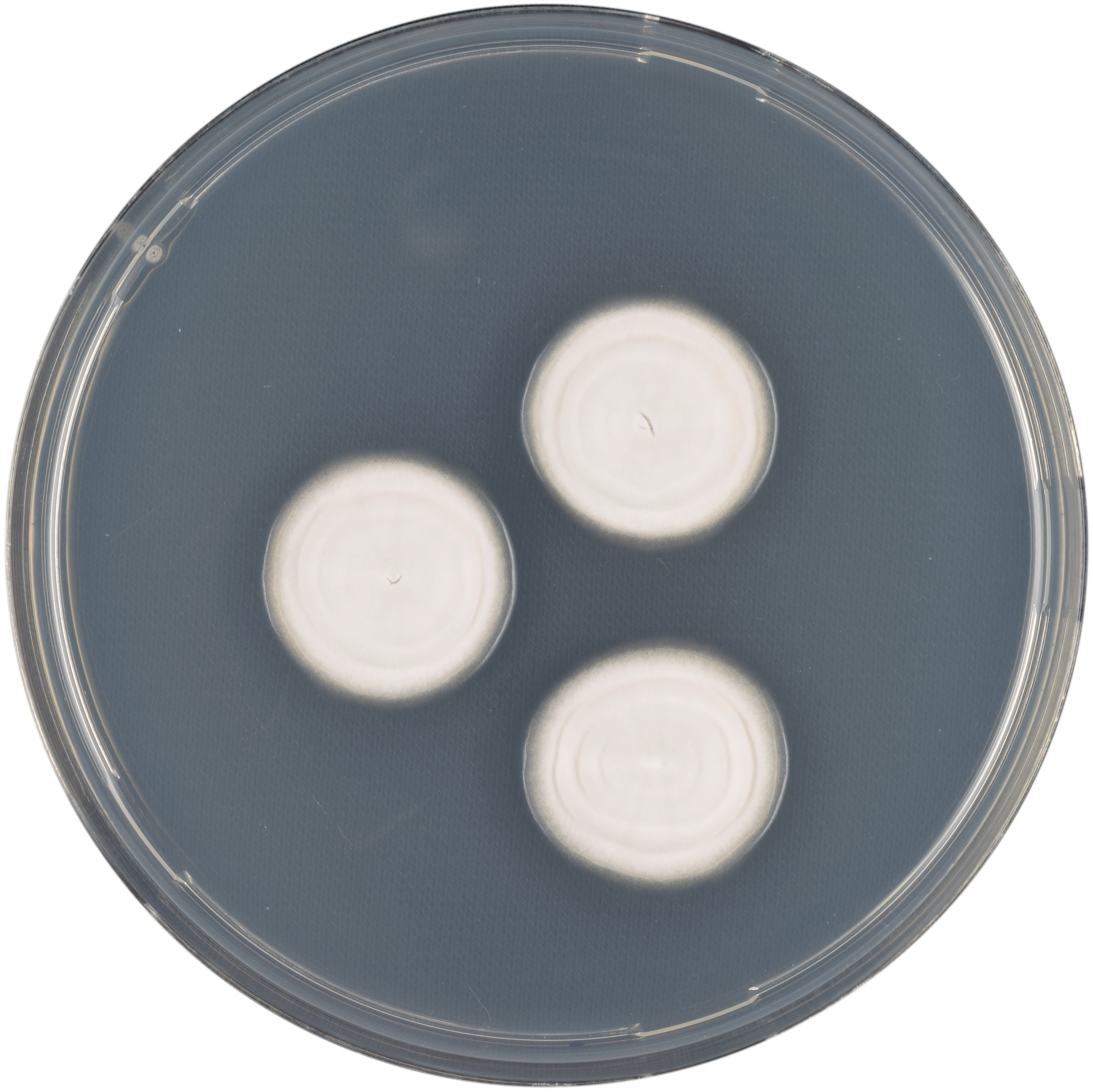
Aspergillus neoglaber growing on CYA plate

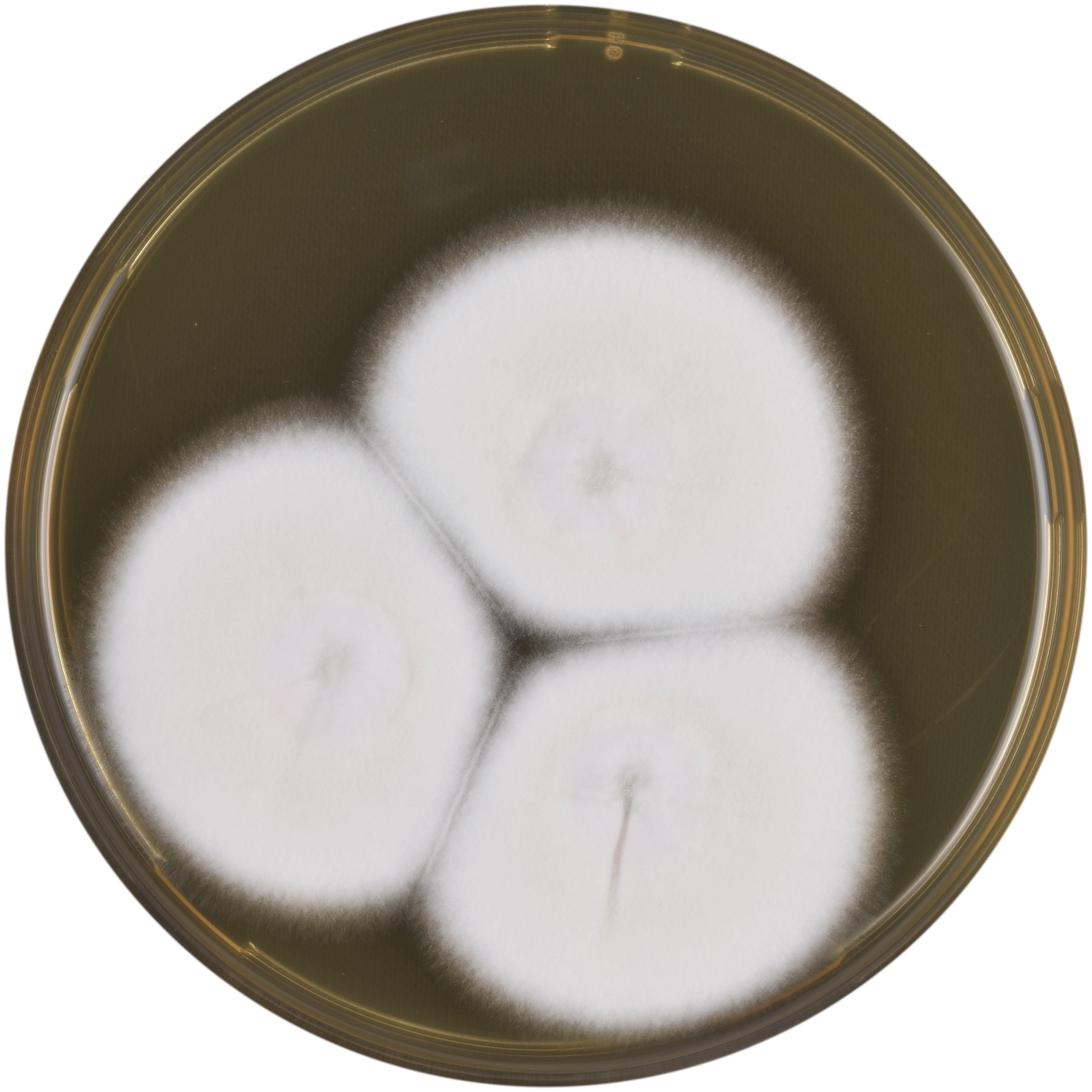
Aspergillus neoglaber growing on MEAOX plate
