= Aspergillus piperis =

Scientific classification
- Kingdom: Fungi
- Division: Ascomycota
- Class: Eurotiomycetes
- Order: Eurotiales
- Family: Aspergillaceae
- Genus: Aspergillus
- Species: A. piperis

Binomial name
- Aspergillus piperis Samson & Frisvad (2004)

Species of fungus

Aspergillus piperis is a species of fungus in the genus Aspergillus. It belongs to the group of black Aspergilli which are important industrial workhorses. A. piperis belongs to the Nigri section and was first described in 2004. It was isolated from black ground pepper and produced large yellow to pink brown sclerotia.

The genome of A. piperis was sequenced and published in 2014 as part of the Aspergillus whole-genome sequencing project – a project dedicated to performing whole-genome sequencing of all members of the genus Aspergillus. The genome assembly size was 35.28 Mbp.

== Growth and morphology ==
Aspergillus piperis has been cultivated on both Czapek yeast extract agar (CYA) plates and Malt Extract Agar Oxoid (MEAOX) plates. The growth morphology of the colonies can be seen in the pictures below.

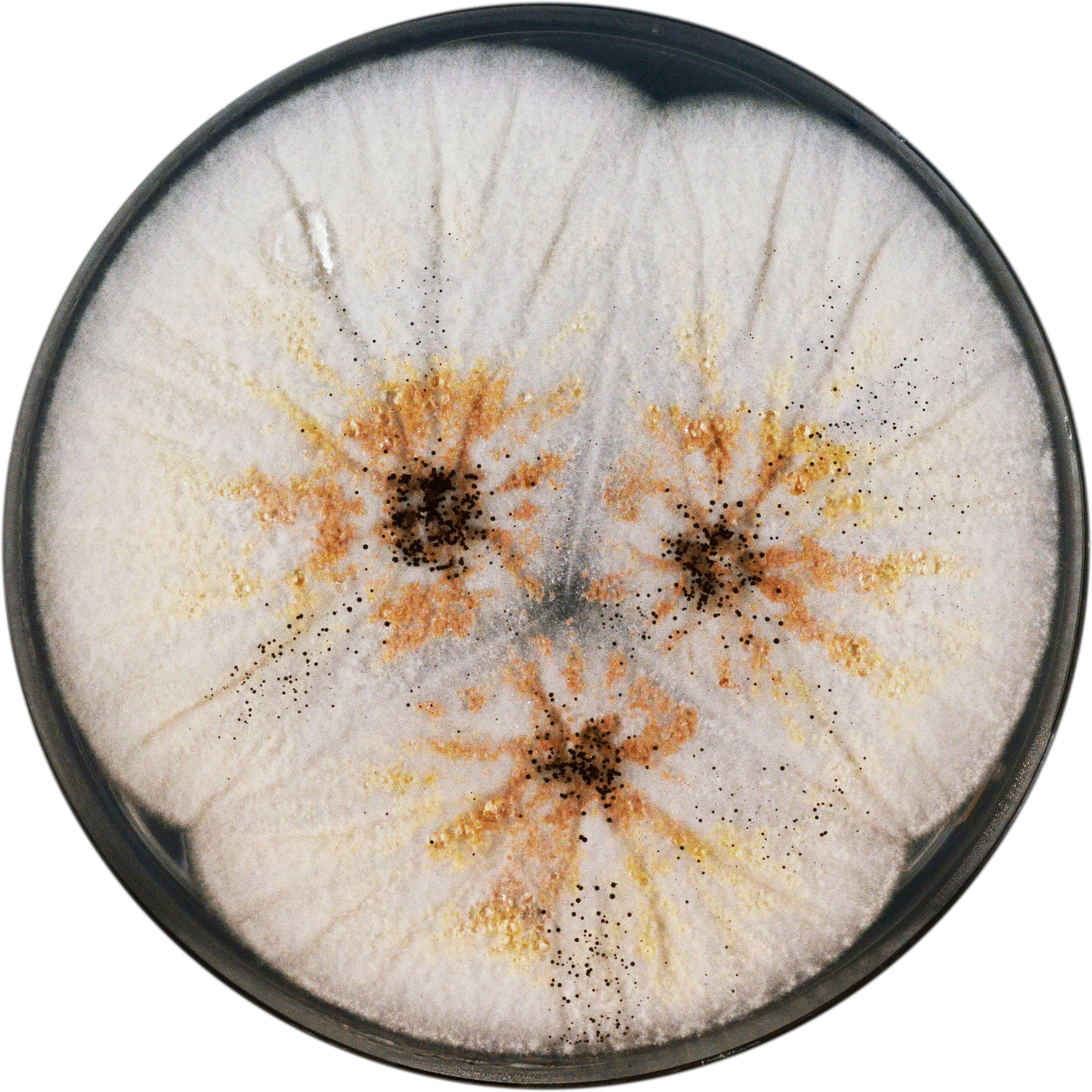
Aspergillus piperis growing on CYA plate

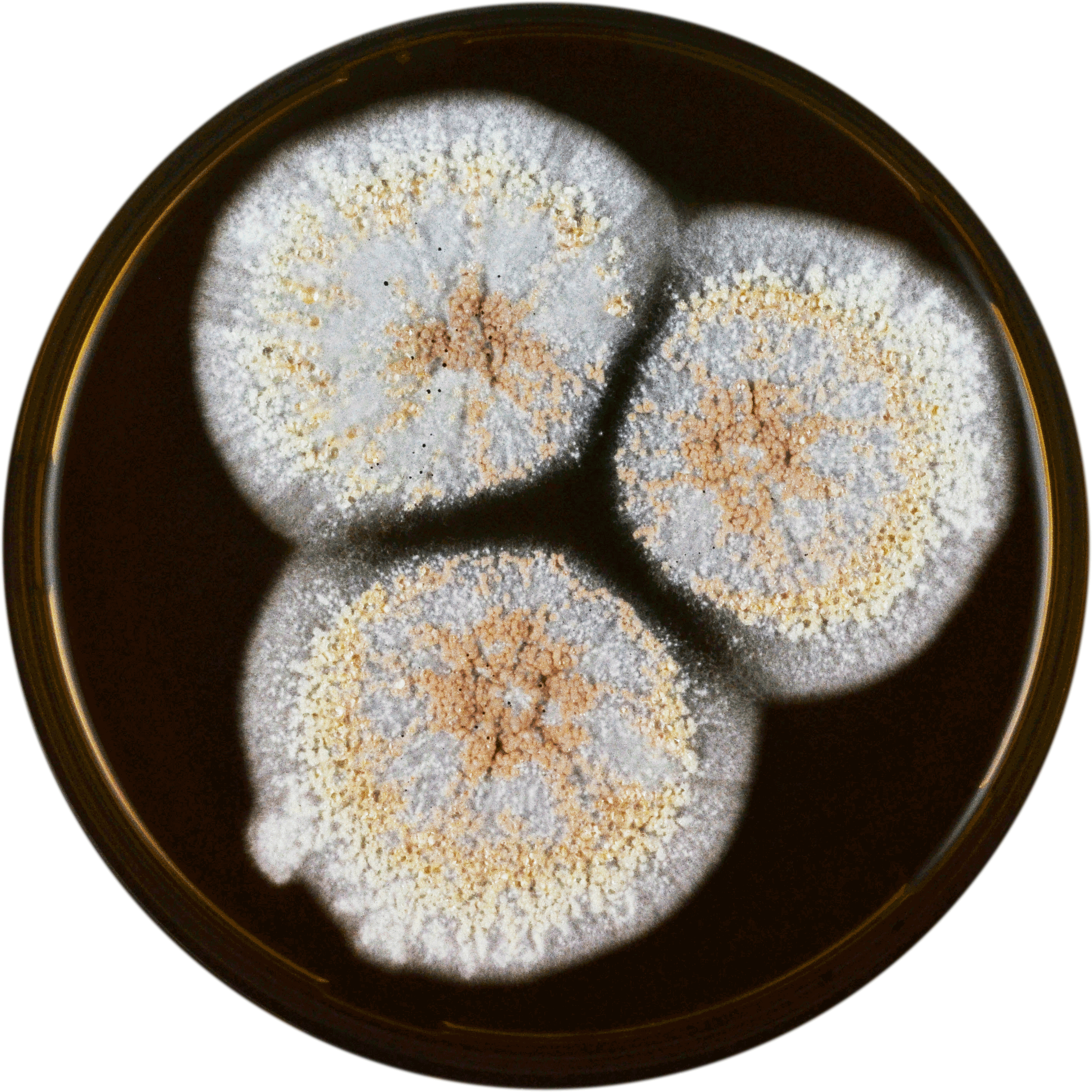
Aspergillus piperis growing on MEAOX plate
