= Aspergillus galapagensis =

Scientific classification
- Kingdom: Fungi
- Division: Ascomycota
- Class: Eurotiomycetes
- Order: Eurotiales
- Family: Aspergillaceae
- Genus: Aspergillus
- Species: A. galapagensis

Binomial name
- Aspergillus galapagensis (Frisvad, S.B. Hong & Samson) Samson, Frisvad & Houbraken (2014)

Synonyms
- Neosartorya galapagensis

Species of fungus

Aspergillus galapagensis (also named Neosartorya galapagensis) is a species of fungus in the genus Aspergillus. It is from the Fumigati section. Several fungi from this section produce heat-resistant ascospores, and the isolates from this section are frequently obtained from locations where natural fires have previously occurred. The species was first described in 2014. It has been isolated from soil in Ecuador. It has been reported to produce gregatins.

== Growth and morphology ==
A. galapagensis has been cultivated on both Czapek yeast extract agar (CYA) plates and Malt Extract Agar Oxoid® (MEAOX) plates. The growth morphology of the colonies can be seen in the pictures below.

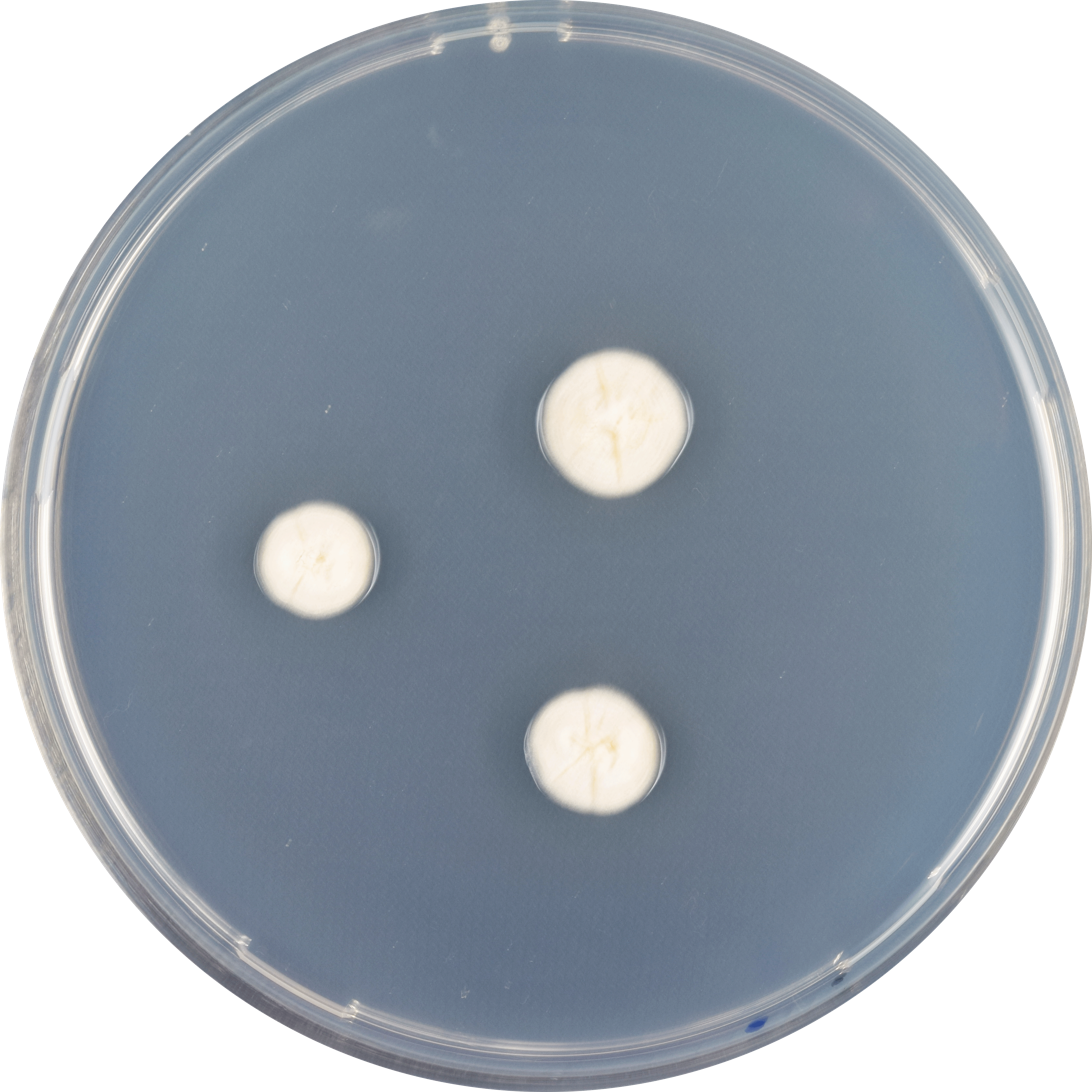
Aspergillus galapagensis growing on CYA plate

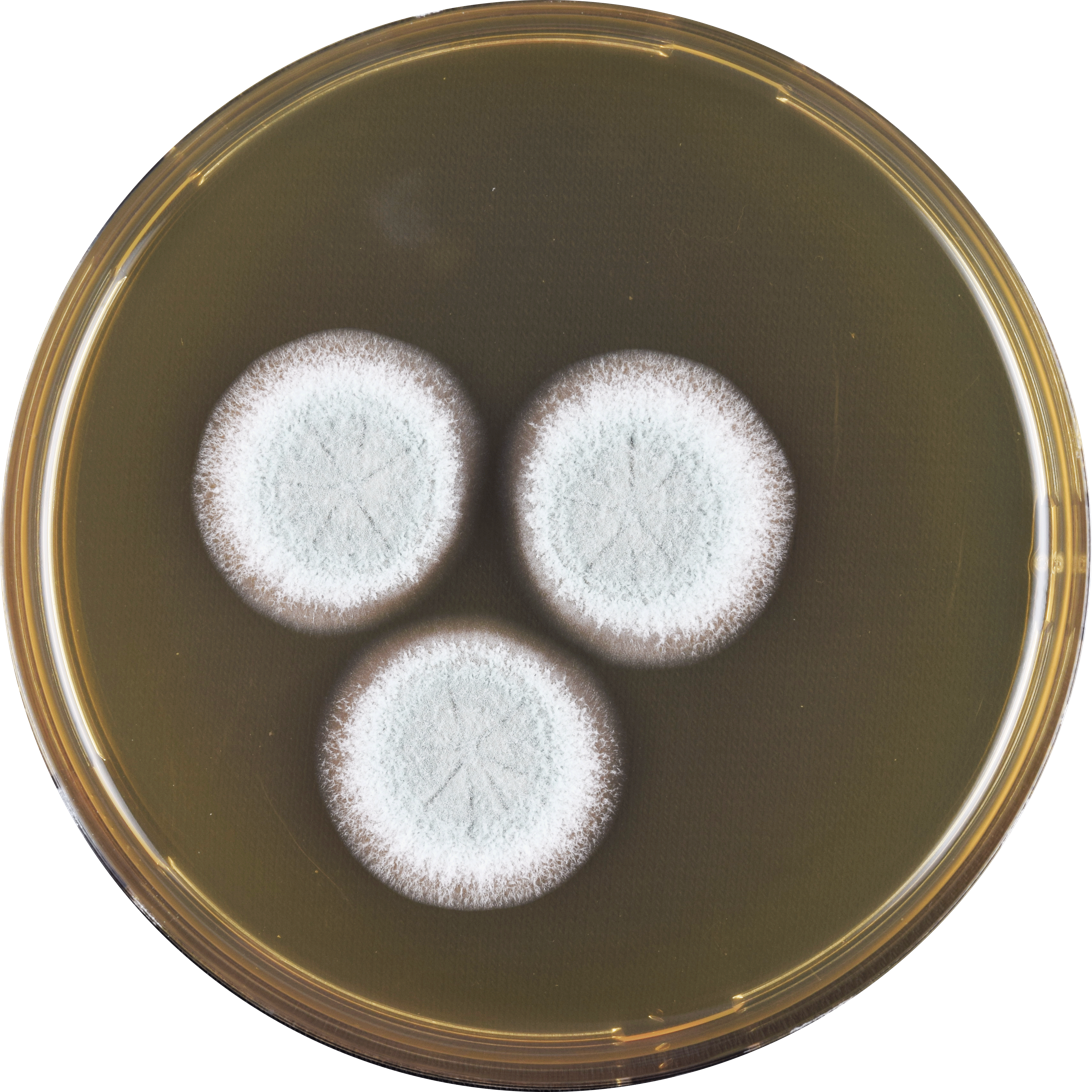
Aspergillus galapagensis growing on MEAOX plate
