= Aspergillus parvulus =

Scientific classification
- Kingdom: Fungi
- Division: Ascomycota
- Class: Eurotiomycetes
- Order: Eurotiales
- Family: Aspergillaceae
- Genus: Aspergillus
- Species: A. parvulus

Binomial name
- Aspergillus parvulus G. Smith (1961)

Species of fungus

Aspergillus parvulus is a species of fungus in the genus Aspergillus. It is from the Cervini section. The species was first described in 1961. It was isolated from soil in the United States and from feed ingredients in Argentina. A. parvulus has been reported to produce naphthalenones.

The genome of A. parvulus was sequenced as a part of the Aspergillus whole-genome sequencing project - a project dedicated to performing whole-genome sequencing of all members of the genus Aspergillus. The genome assembly size was 32.73 Mbp.

== Growth and morphology ==
Aspergillus parvulus has been cultivated on both Czapek yeast extract agar (CYA) plates and Malt Extract Agar Oxoid® (MEAOX) plates. The growth morphology of the colonies can be seen in the pictures below.

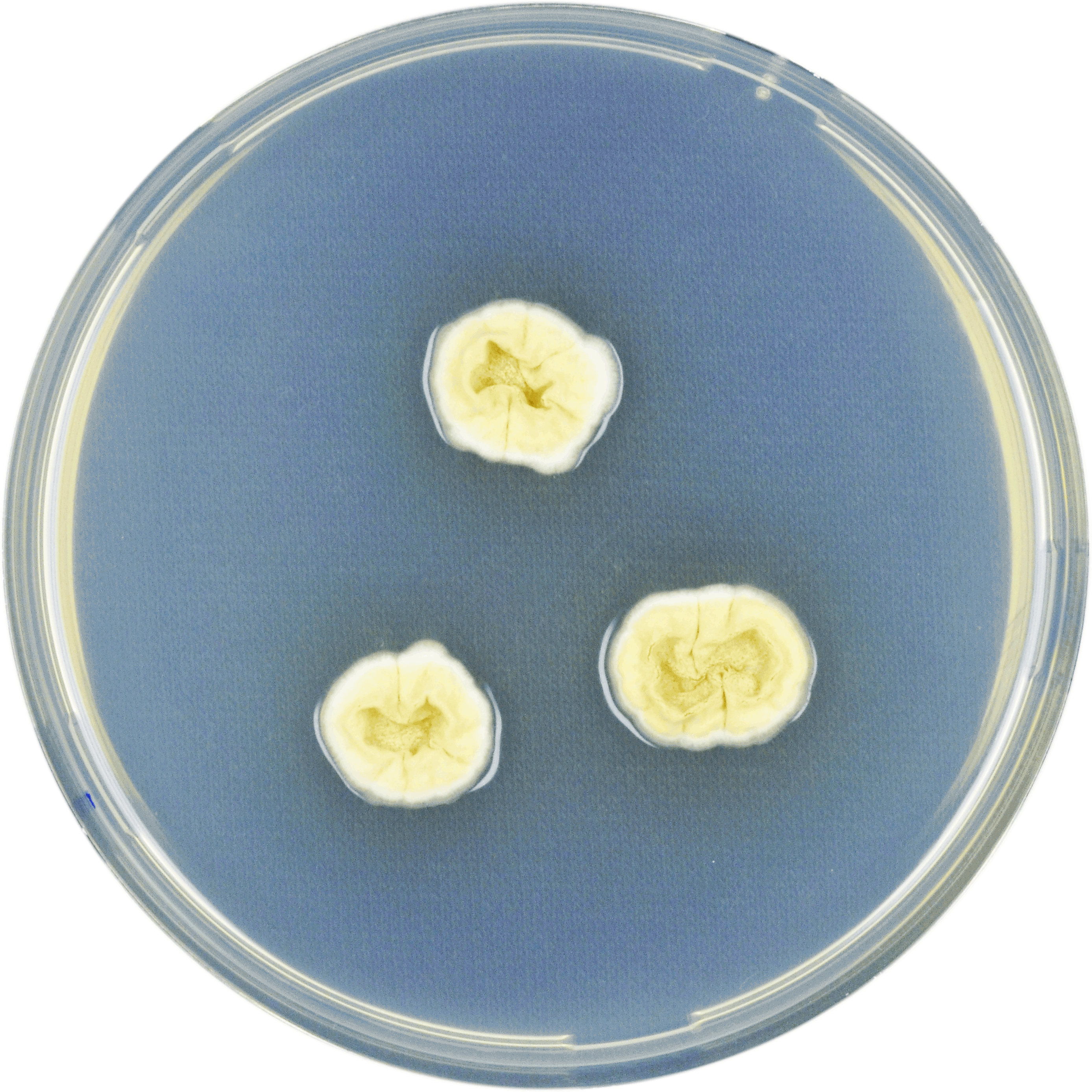
Aspergillus parvulus growing on CYA plate

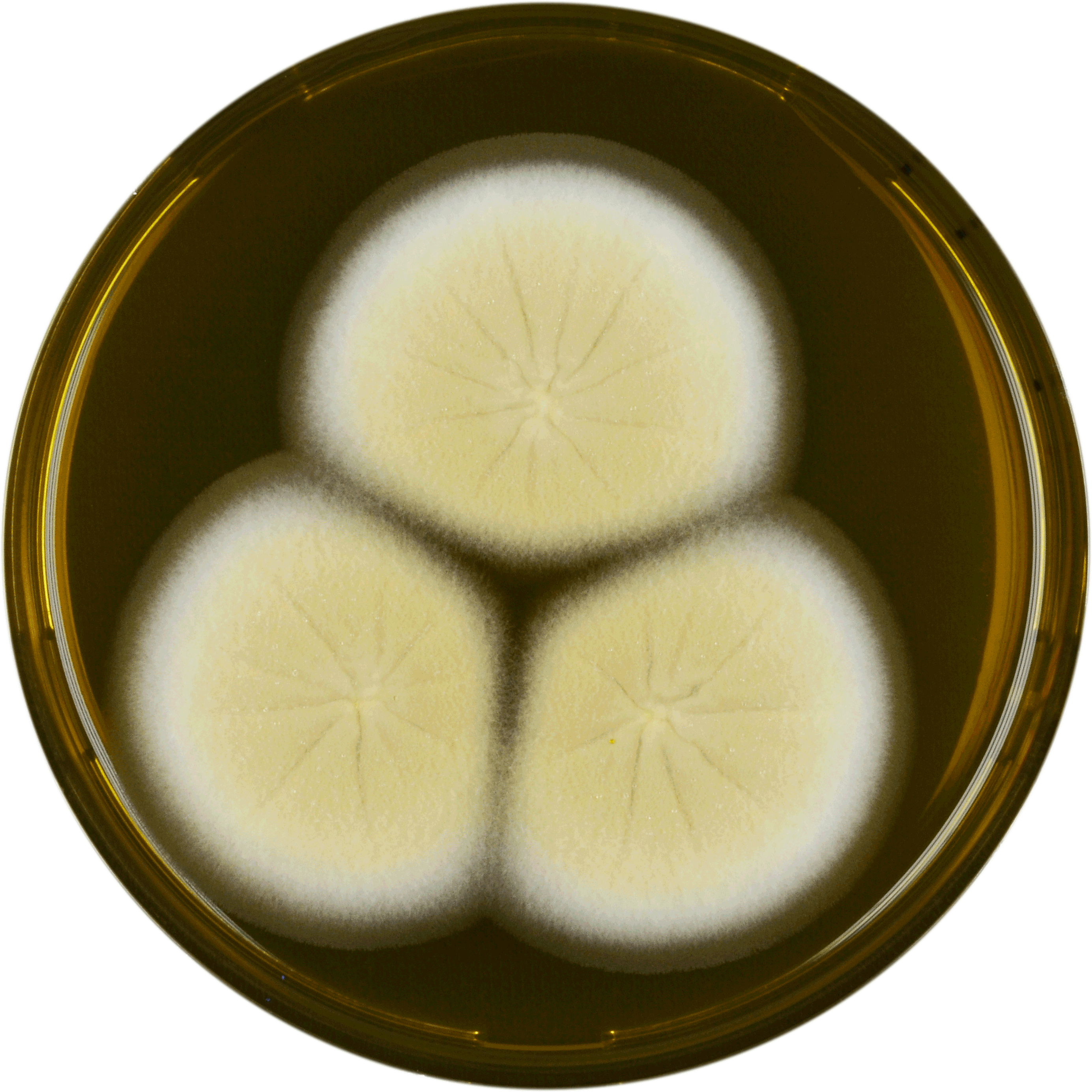
Aspergillus parvulus growing on MEAOX plate
