= Aspergillus zutongqii =

Scientific classification
- Kingdom: Fungi
- Division: Ascomycota
- Class: Eurotiomycetes
- Order: Eurotiales
- Family: Aspergillaceae
- Genus: Aspergillus
- Species: A. zutongqii

Binomial name
- Aspergillus zutongqii A.J. Chen, J.C. Frisvad & R.A. Samson (2017)

Species of fungus

Aspergillus zutongqii is a species of fungus in the genus Aspergillus. It is from the Aspergillus section. The species was first described in 2017. It has been reported to produce asperflavin, auroglaucin, bisanthrons, dihydroauroglaucin, echinulins, emodin, epiheveadrides, erythroglaucin, flavoglaucin, isoechinulins, neoechinulins, and tetrahydroauroglaucin.

== Growth and morphology ==
A. zutongqii has been cultivated on both Czapek yeast extract agar (CYA) plates and Malt Extract Agar Oxoid® (MEAOX) plates. The growth morphology of the colonies can be seen in the pictures below.

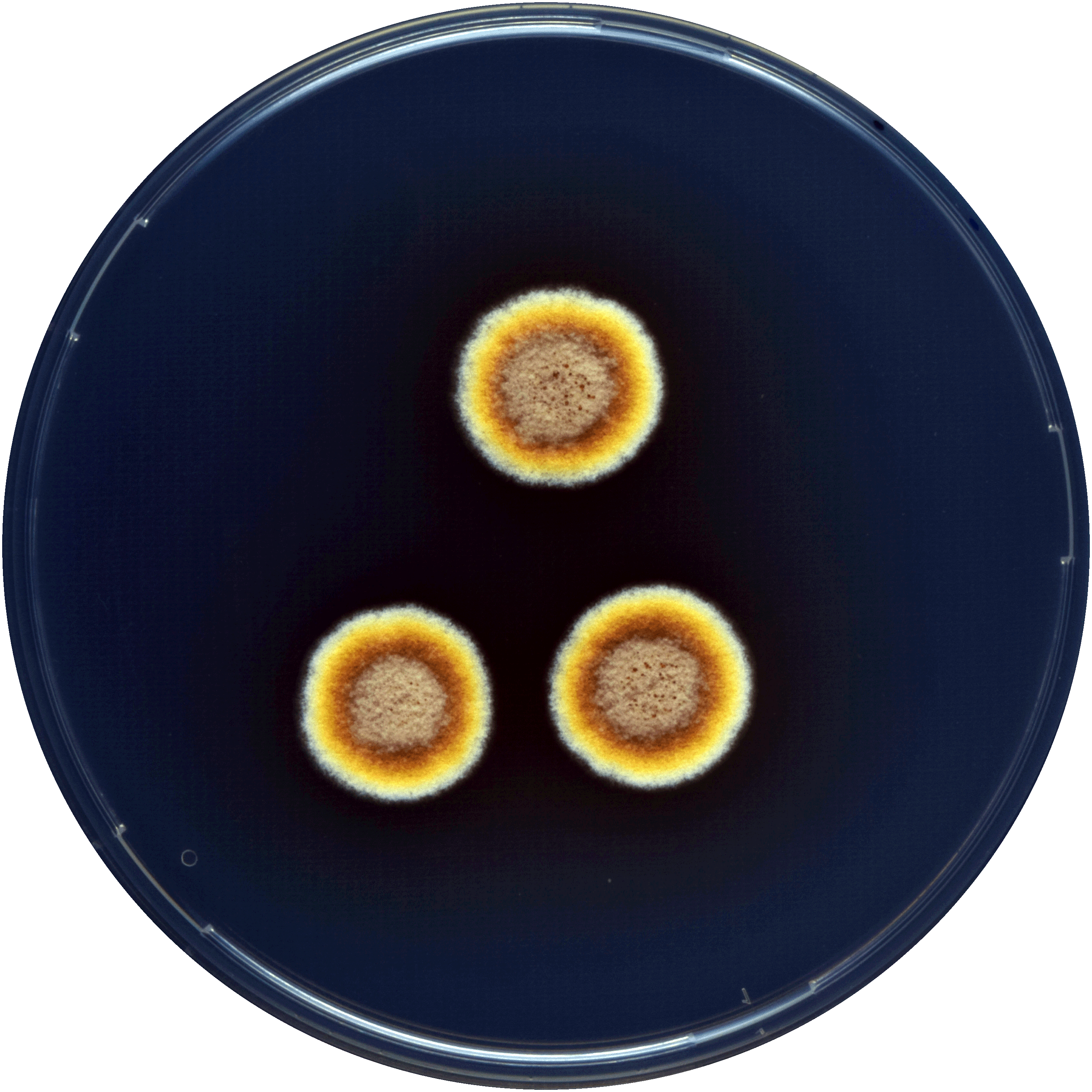
Aspergillus zutongqii growing on CYA plate

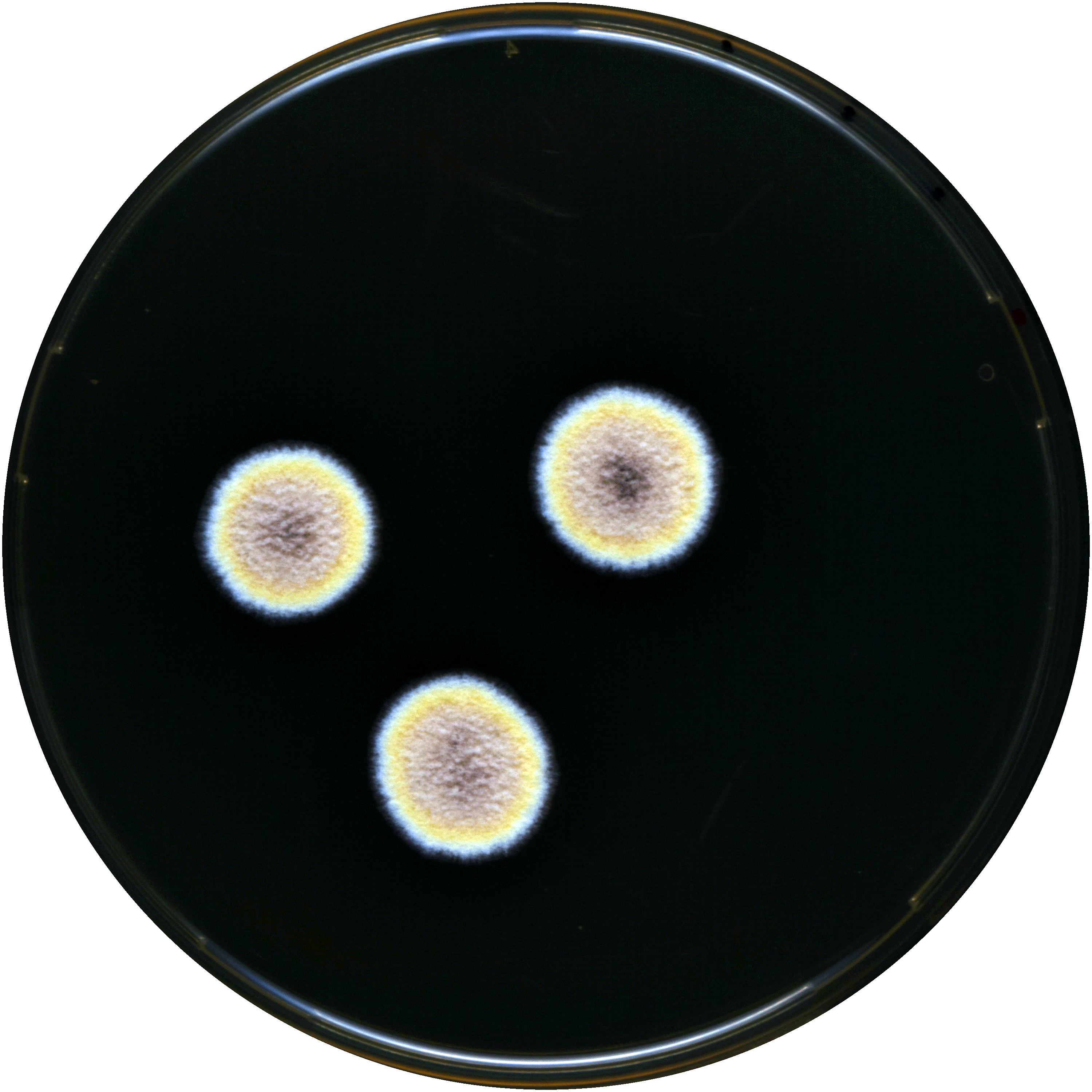
Aspergillus zutongqii growing on MEAOX plate
