= Aspergillus papuensis =

Scientific classification
- Kingdom: Fungi
- Division: Ascomycota
- Class: Eurotiomycetes
- Order: Eurotiales
- Family: Aspergillaceae
- Genus: Aspergillus
- Species: A. papuensis

Binomial name
- Aspergillus papuensis (Samson, Hong & Varga) Samson, S.B. Hong & Varga (2014)

Synonyms
- Neosartorya papuensis

Species of fungus

Aspergillus papuensis (also known as Neosartorya papuensis) is a species of fungus in the genus Aspergillus. It is from the Fumigati section. Several fungi from this section produce heat-resistant ascospores, and the isolates from this section are frequently obtained from locations where natural fires have previously occurred. The species was first described in 2014. It has been isolated in Papua New Guinea.

== Growth and morphology ==
A. papuensis has been cultivated on both Czapek yeast extract agar (CYA) plates and Malt Extract Agar Oxoid® (MEAOX) plates. The growth morphology of the colonies can be seen in the pictures below.

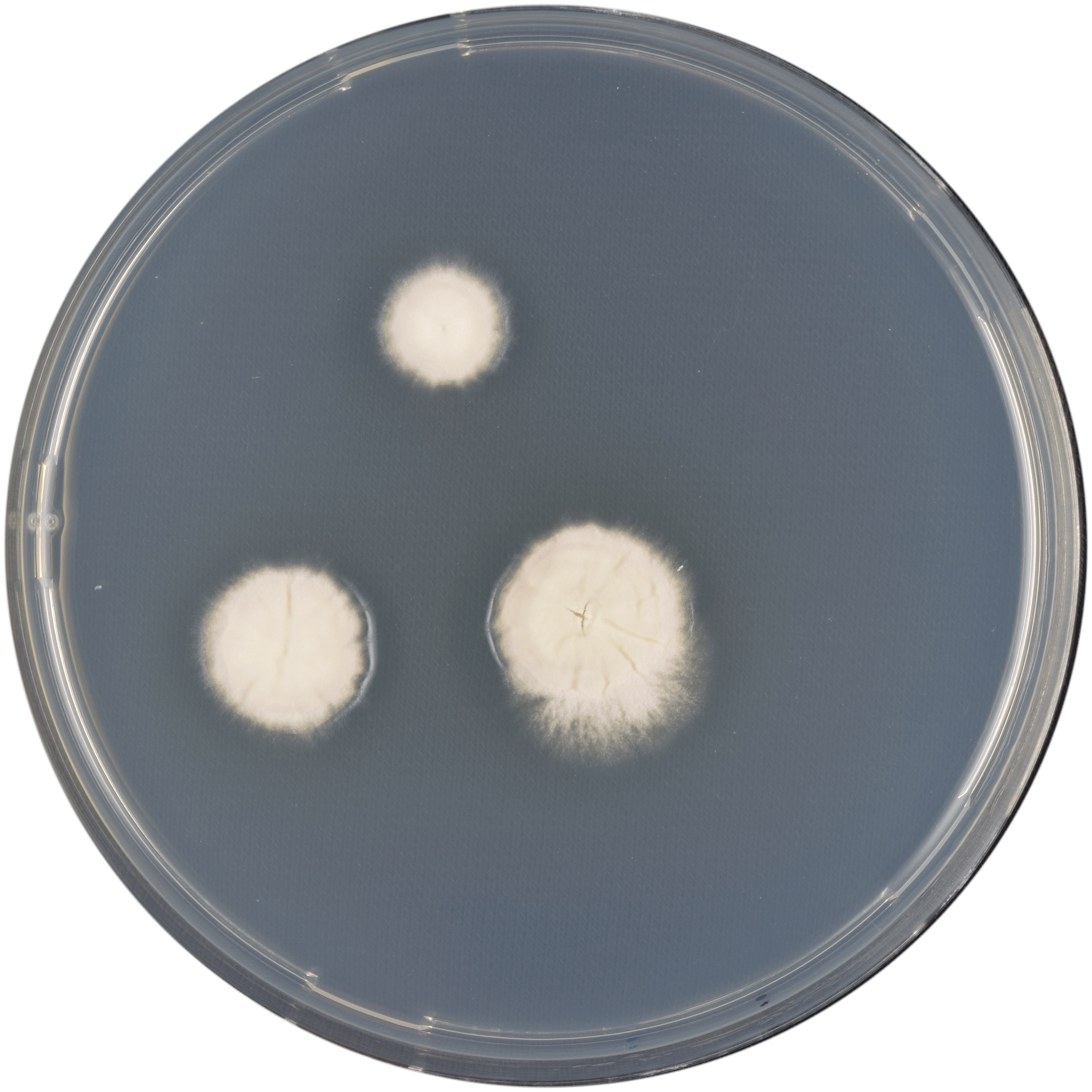
Aspergillus papuensis growing on CYA plate

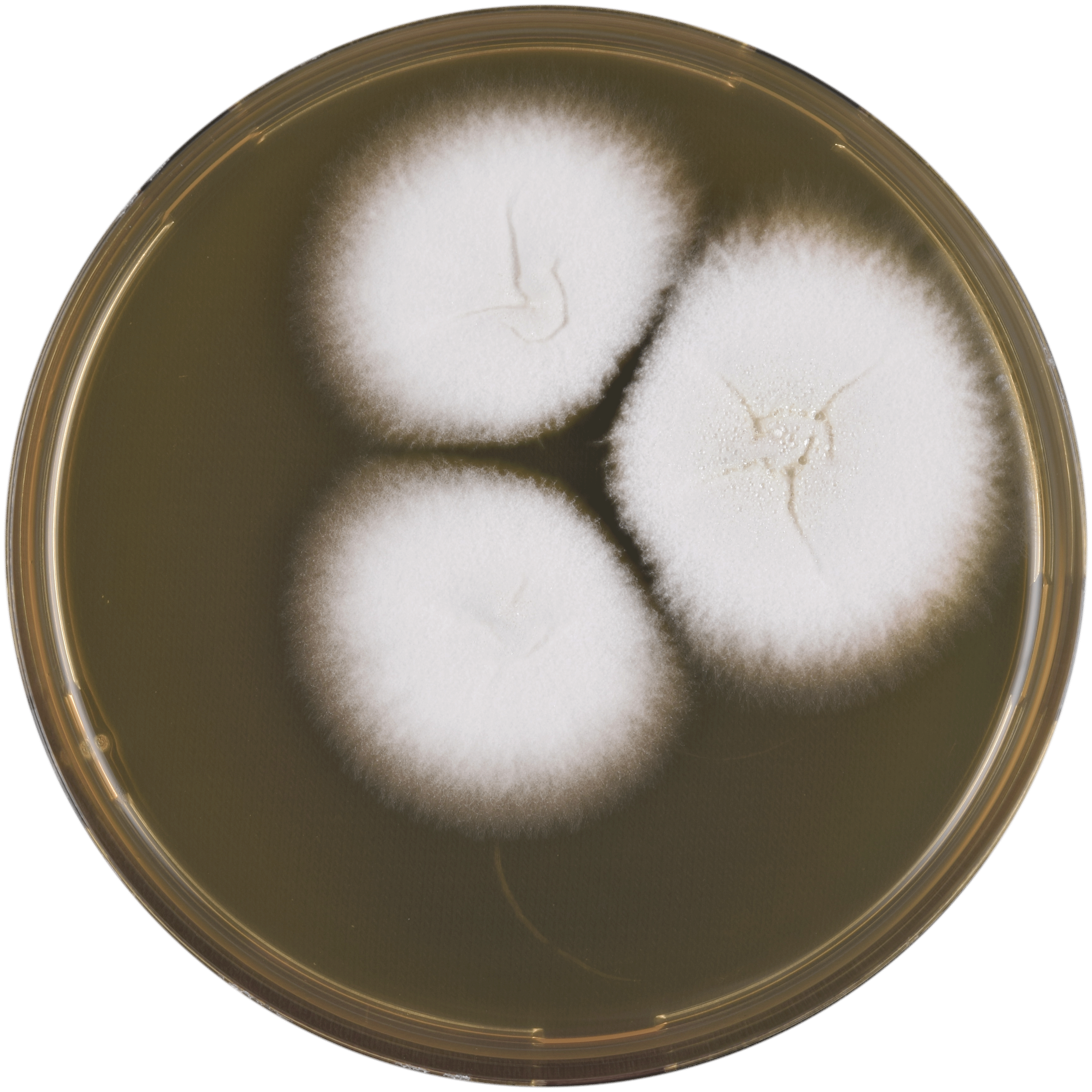
Aspergillus papuensis growing on MEAOX plate
