= Aspergillus caatingaensis =

Scientific classification
- Kingdom: Fungi
- Division: Ascomycota
- Class: Eurotiomycetes
- Order: Eurotiales
- Family: Aspergillaceae
- Genus: Aspergillus
- Species: A. caatingaensis

Binomial name
- Aspergillus caatingaensis Y. Horie, Matsuzawa, Yaguchi & Takaki (2014)

Species of fungus

Aspergillus caatingaensis is a species of fungus in the genus Aspergillus. It is from the Fumigati section. Several fungi from this section produce heat-resistant ascospores, and the isolates from this section are frequently obtained from locations where natural fires have previously occurred. The species was first described in 2014. It has been isolated from semi-desert soil in the Caatinga area in Brazil.

== Growth and morphology ==
A. caatingaensis has been cultivated on both Czapek yeast extract agar (CYA) plates and Malt Extract Agar Oxoid® (MEAOX) plates. The growth morphology of the colonies can be seen in the pictures below.

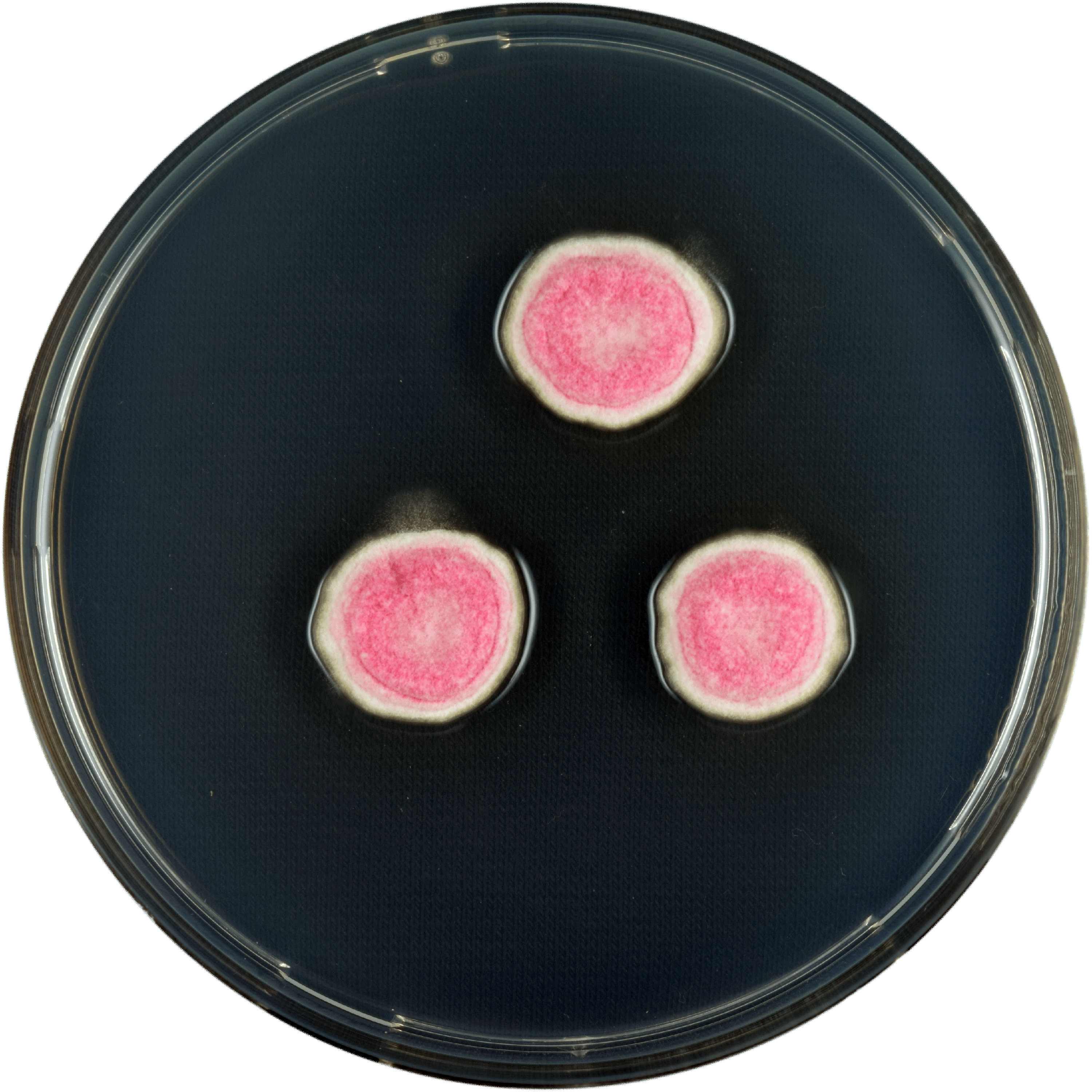
Aspergillus caatingaensis growing on CYA plate

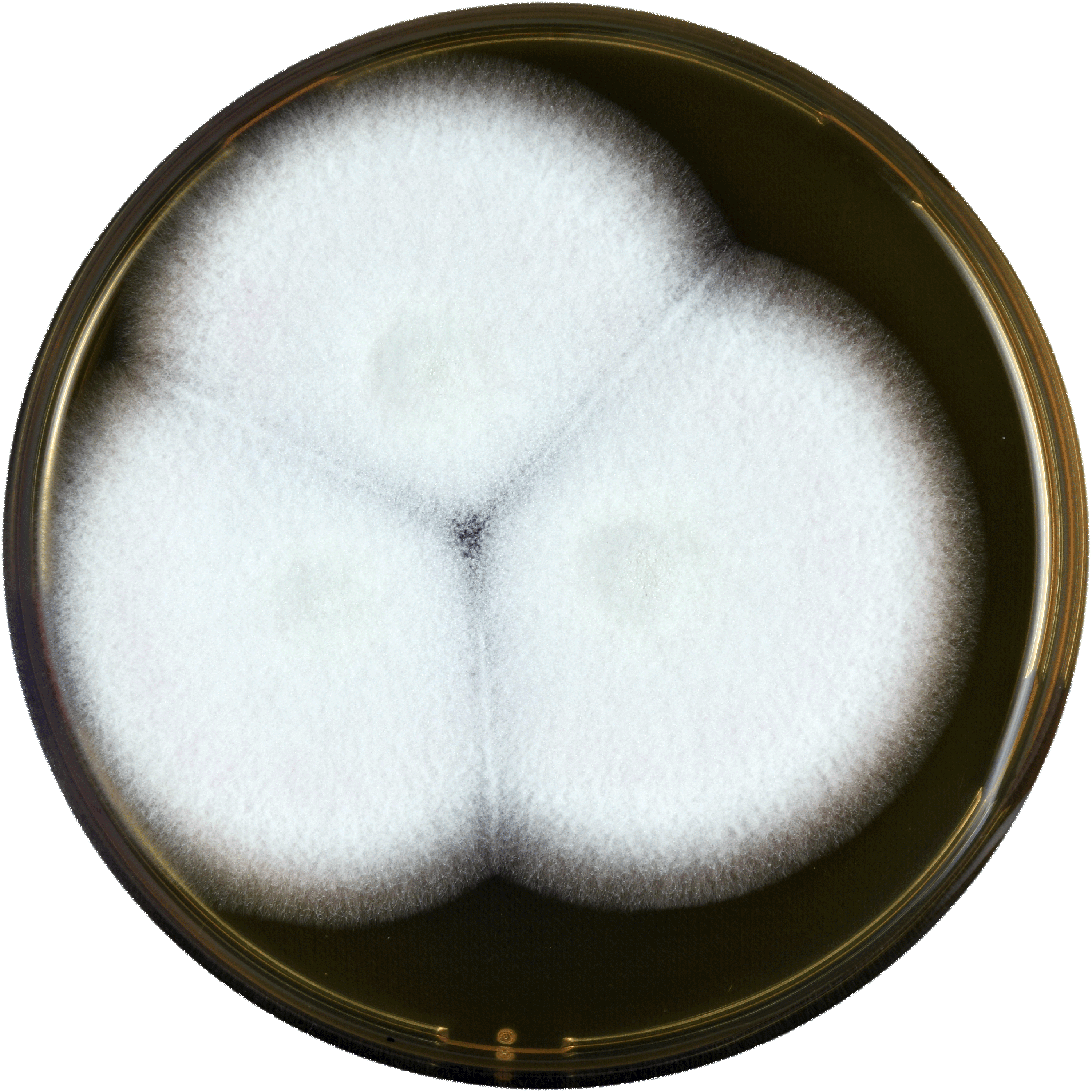
Aspergillus caatingaensis growing on MEAOX plate
