= Aspergillus montevidensis =

Scientific classification
- Kingdom: Fungi
- Division: Ascomycota
- Class: Eurotiomycetes
- Order: Eurotiales
- Family: Aspergillaceae
- Genus: Aspergillus
- Species: A. montevidensis

Binomial name
- Aspergillus montevidensis Talice & J.A. Mackinnon (1931)

Species of fungus

Aspergillus montevidensis is a species of fungus in the genus Aspergillus. It is from the Aspergillus section. The species was first described in 1931. It has been reported to produce apolar indoloterpenes, asperflavin in few isolates, auroglaucin, dihydroauroglaucin, echinulins, epiheveadrides, flavoglaucin, isoechinulins, neoechinulins, and tetrahydroauroglaucin.

== Growth and morphology ==
A. montevidensis has been cultivated on both Czapek yeast extract agar (CYA) plates and Malt Extract Agar Oxoid® (MEAOX) plates. The growth morphology of the colonies can be seen in the pictures below.

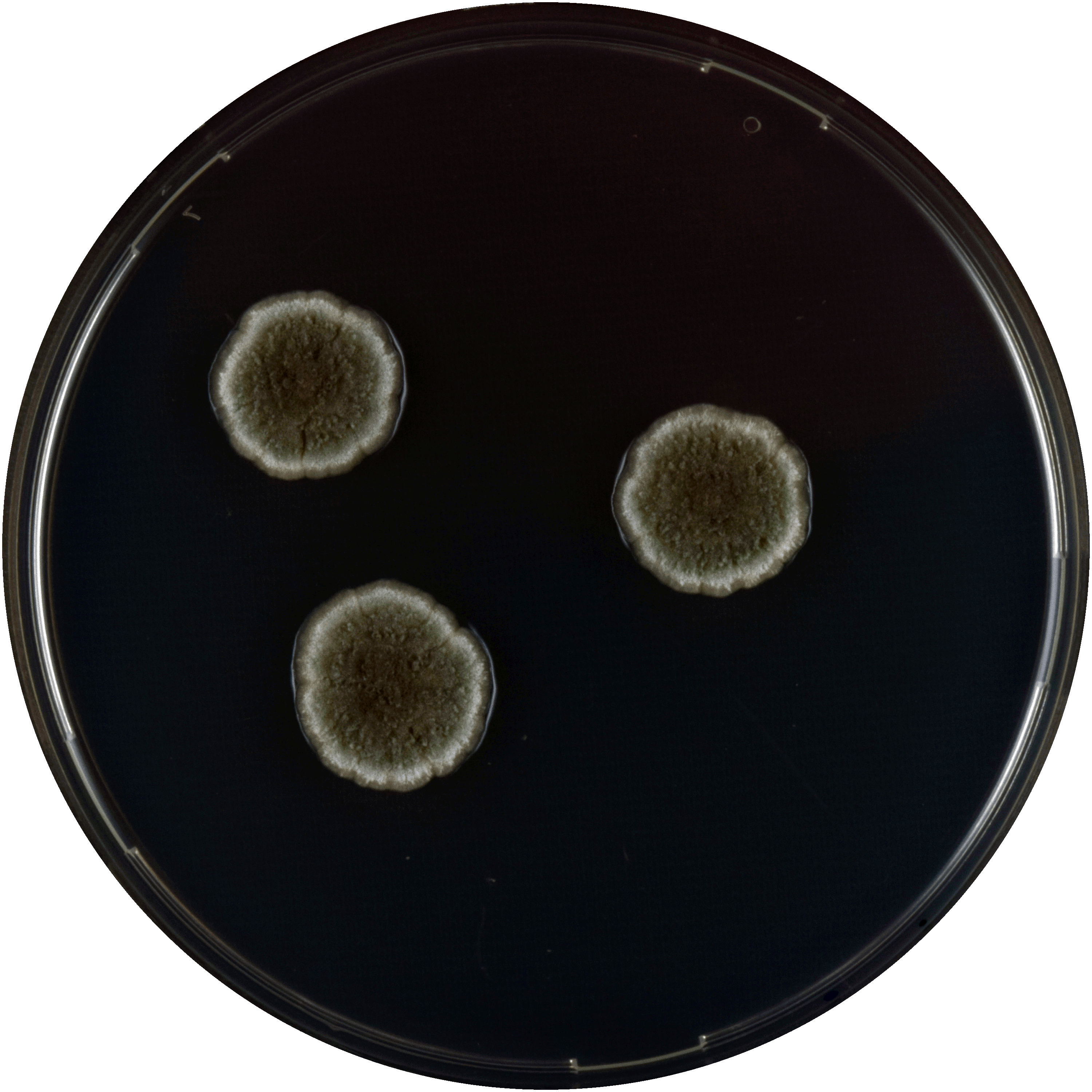
Aspergillus montevidensis growing on CYA plate

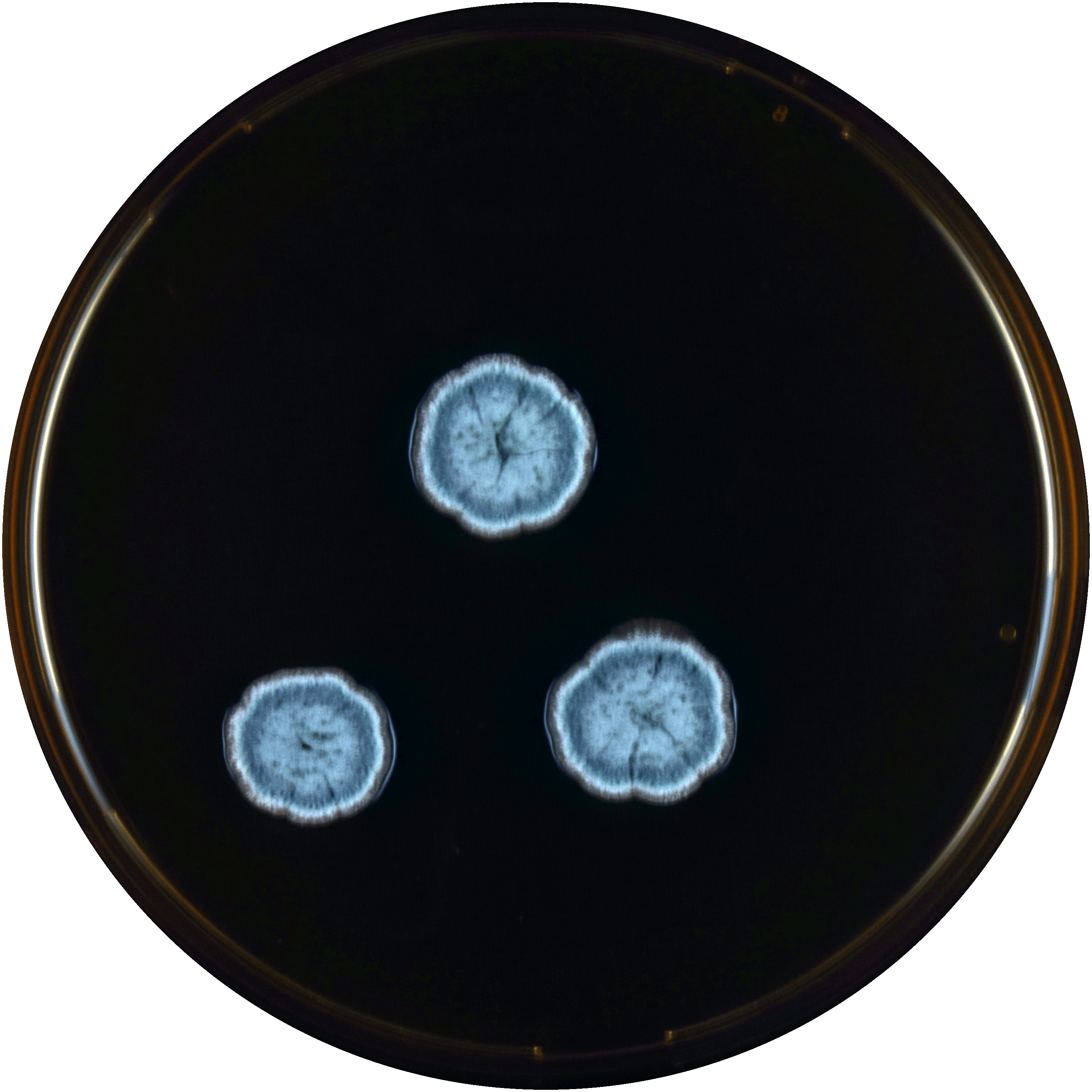
Aspergillus montevidensis growing on MEAOX plate
