= Aspergillus insolitus =

Scientific classification
- Kingdom: Fungi
- Division: Ascomycota
- Class: Eurotiomycetes
- Order: Eurotiales
- Family: Aspergillaceae
- Genus: Aspergillus
- Species: A. insolitus

Binomial name
- Aspergillus insolitus (G. Smith) Houbraken, Visagie & Samson (2014)

Species of fungus

Aspergillus insolitus is a species of fungus in the genus Aspergillus. It is from the Polypaecilum section. The species was first described in 2014. The genome of A. insolitus was in 2016 sequenced as a part of the Aspergillus whole-genome sequencing project - a project dedicated to performing whole-genome sequencing of all members of the genus Aspergillus. The genome assembly size was 23.18 Mbp.

== Growth and morphology ==
A. insolitus has been cultivated on both Czapek yeast extract agar (CYA) plates and Malt Extract Agar Oxoid® (MEAOX) plates. The growth morphology of the colonies can be seen in the pictures below.

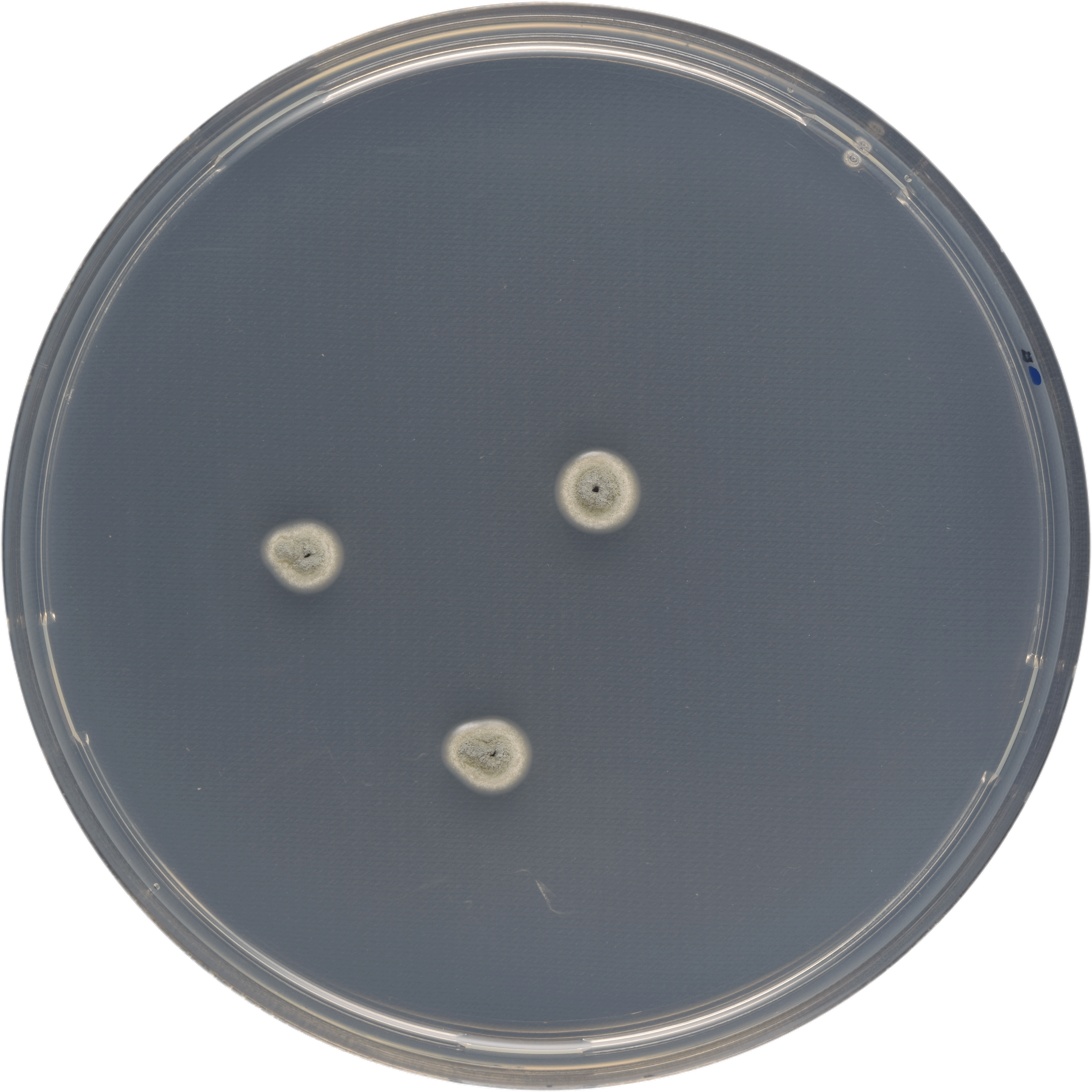
Aspergillus insolitus growing on CYA plate

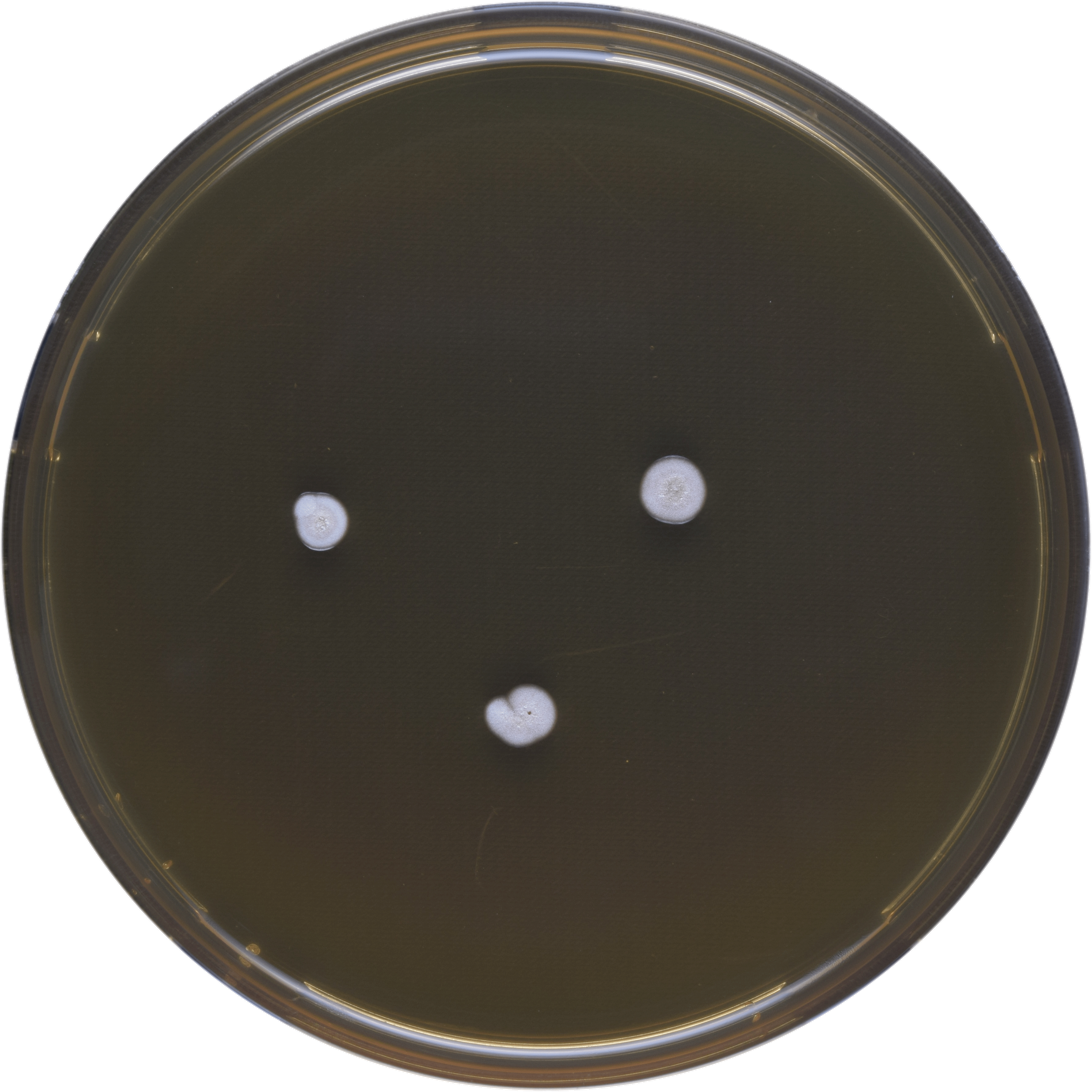
Aspergillus insolitus growing on MEAOX plate
