= Aspergillus cibarius =

Scientific classification
- Kingdom: Fungi
- Division: Ascomycota
- Class: Eurotiomycetes
- Order: Eurotiales
- Family: Aspergillaceae
- Genus: Aspergillus
- Species: A. cibarius

Binomial name
- Aspergillus cibarius S.B. Hong & R.A. Samson (2012)

Species of fungus

Aspergillus cibarius is a species of fungus in the genus Aspergillus. It is from the Aspergillus section. The species was first described in 2012. It has been reported to produce asperflavin, auroglaucin, bisanthrons, dihydroauroglaucin, echinulins, emodin, erythroglaucin, flavoglaucin, neoechinulins physcion, tetracyclic, and tetrahydroauroglaucin.

== Growth and morphology ==
A. cibarius has been cultivated on both Czapek yeast extract agar (CYA) plates and yeast extract sucrose agar (YES) plates. The growth morphology of the colonies can be seen in the pictures below.

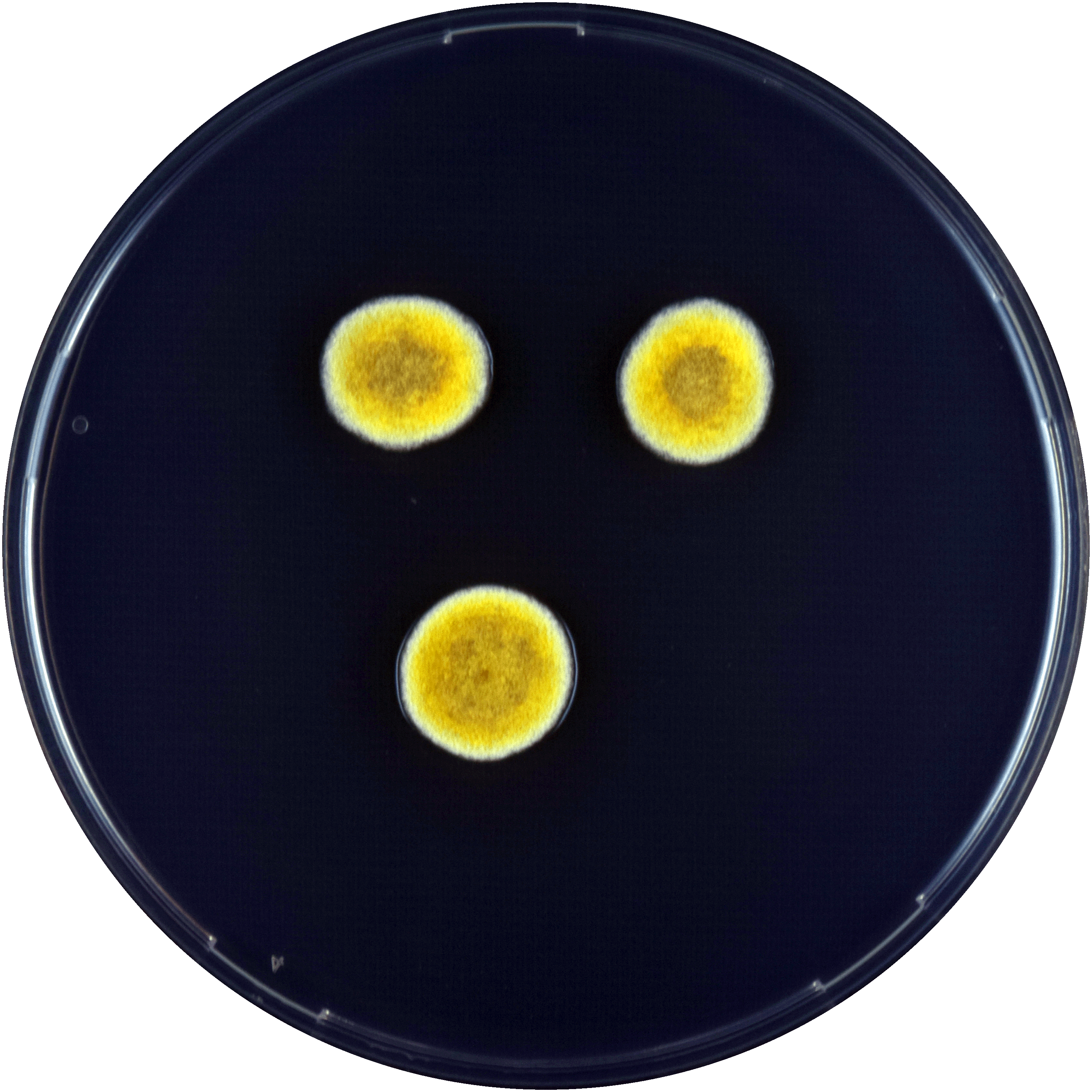
Aspergillus cibarius growing on CYA plate

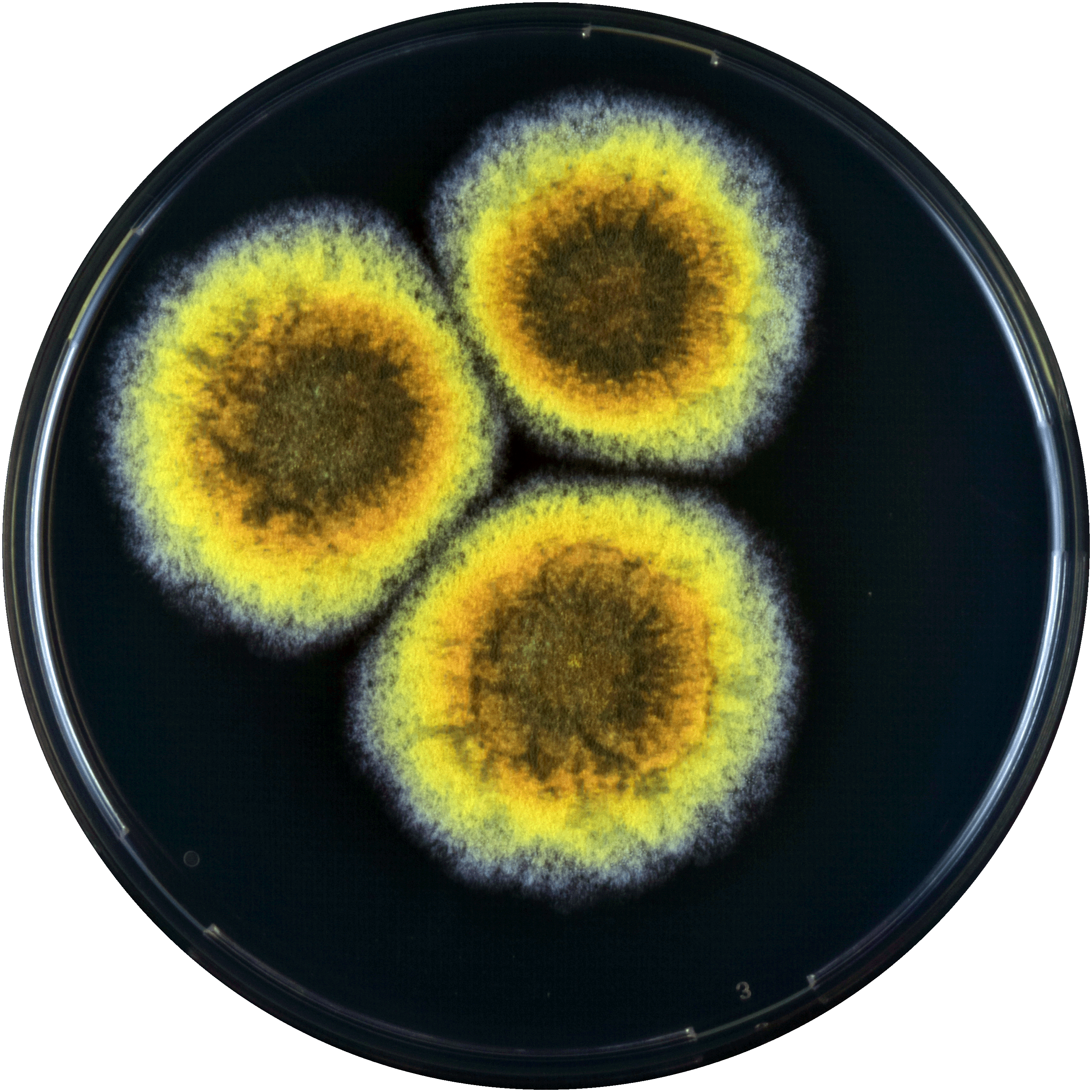
Aspergillus cibarius growing on YES plate
