= Aspergillus mallochii =

Scientific classification
- Kingdom: Fungi
- Division: Ascomycota
- Class: Eurotiomycetes
- Order: Eurotiales
- Family: Aspergillaceae
- Genus: Aspergillus
- Species: A. mallochii

Binomial name
- Aspergillus mallochii C.M. Visagie, N. Yilmaz & K.A. Seifert (2017)

Species of fungus

Aspergillus mallochii is a species of fungus in the genus Aspergillus. It is from the Aspergillus section. The species was first described in 2017. It has been reported to produce auroglaucin, dihydroauroglaucin, echinulins, erythroglaucin, flavoglaucin, isoechinulins, neoechinulins, tetracyclic, and tetrahydroauroglaucin.

== Growth and morphology ==
A. mallochii has been cultivated on both Czapek yeast extract agar (CYA) plates and yeast extract sucrose agar (YES) plates. The growth morphology of the colonies can be seen in the pictures below.

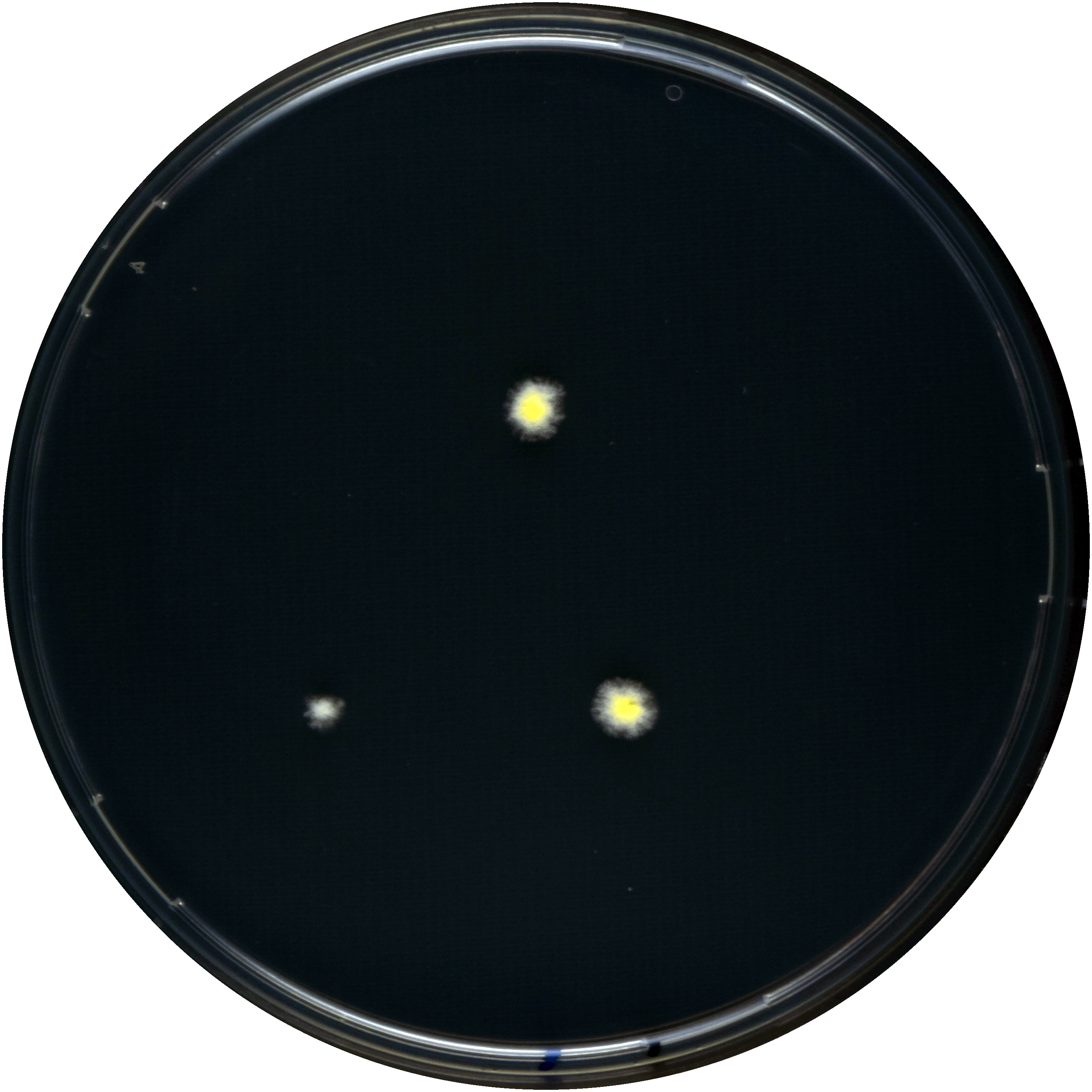
Aspergillus mallochii growing on CYA plate

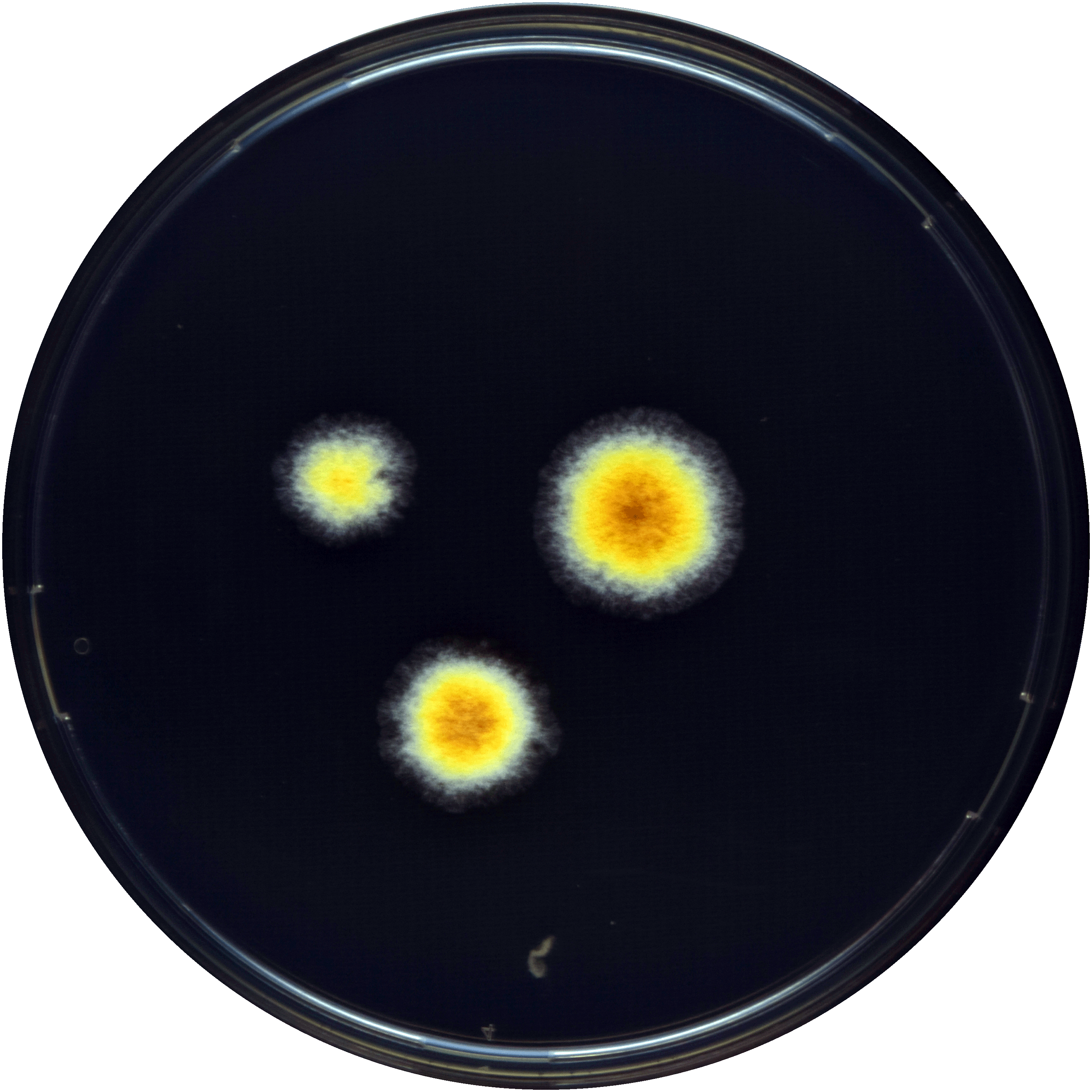
Aspergillus mallochii growing on YES plate
