= Aspergillus tonophilus =

Scientific classification
- Kingdom: Fungi
- Division: Ascomycota
- Class: Eurotiomycetes
- Order: Eurotiales
- Family: Aspergillaceae
- Genus: Aspergillus
- Species: A. tonophilus

Binomial name
- Aspergillus tonophilus Ohtsuki (1962)

Species of fungus

Aspergillus tonophilus is a species of fungus in the genus Aspergillus. It is from the Aspergillus section. The species was first described in 1962. It has been reported to produce auroglaucin, bisanthrons, dihydroauroglaucin, echinulins, flavoglaucin, an apolar indoloterpene, isoechinulins, neoechinulins, and tetrahydroauroglaucin.

== Growth and morphology ==
A. tonophilus has been cultivated on both yeast extract sucrose agar (YES) plates and Malt Extract Agar Oxoid® (MEAOX) plates. The growth morphology of the colonies can be seen in the pictures below.

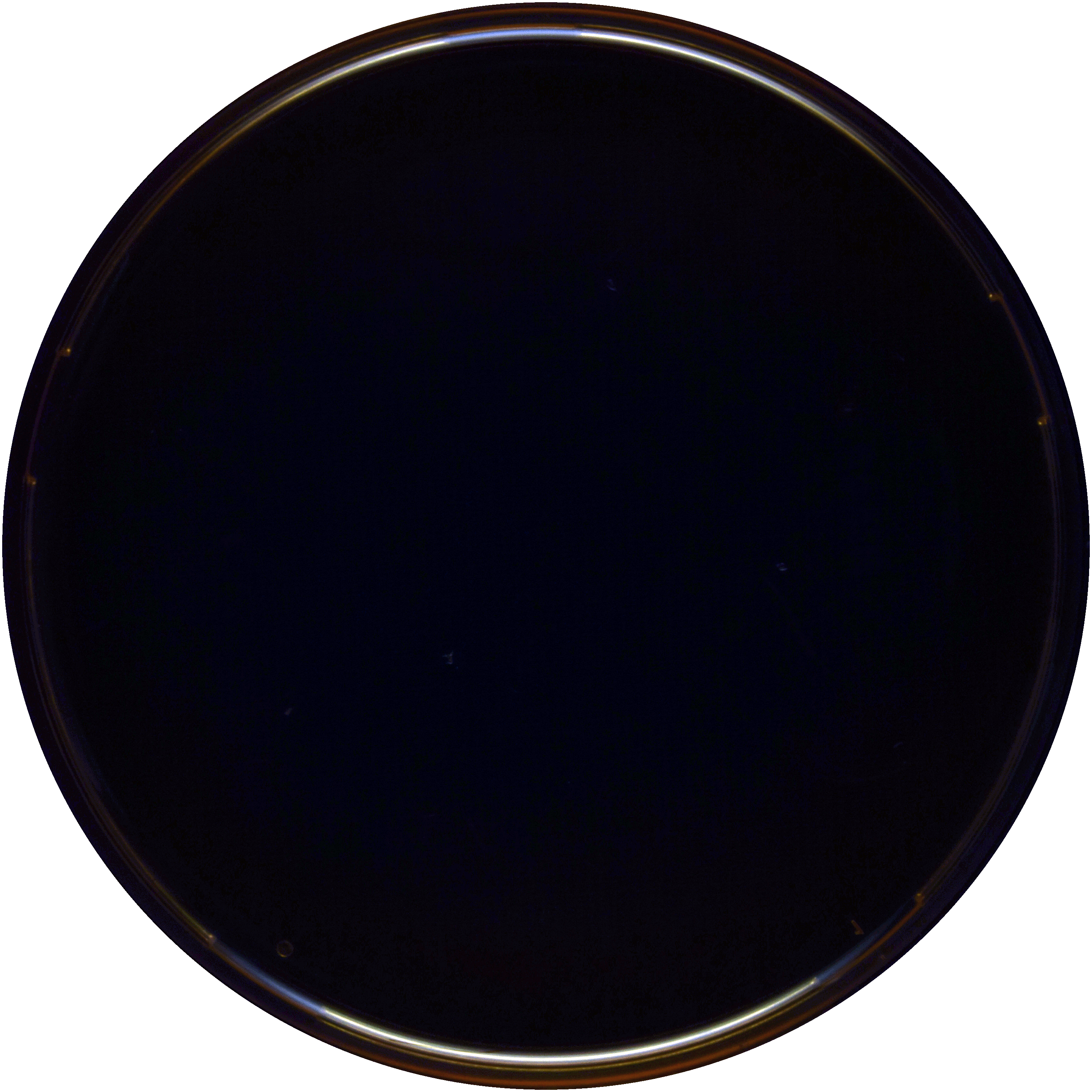
Aspergillus tonophilus growing on MEAOX plate

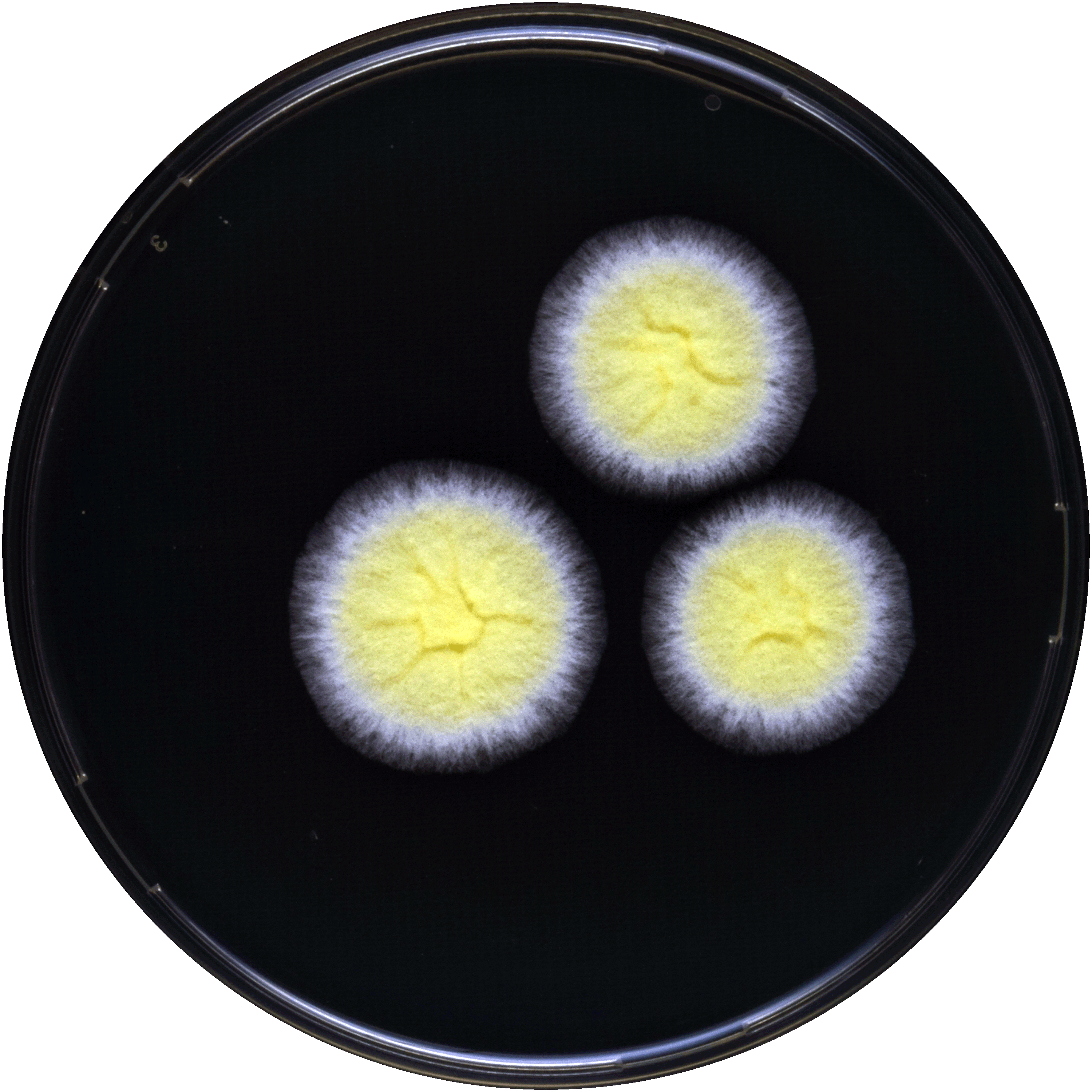
Aspergillus tonophilus growing on YES plate
