= Aspergillus pseudofelis =

Scientific classification
- Kingdom: Fungi
- Division: Ascomycota
- Class: Eurotiomycetes
- Order: Eurotiales
- Family: Aspergillaceae
- Genus: Aspergillus
- Species: A. pseudofelis

Binomial name
- Aspergillus pseudofelis J.A. Sugui, S.W. Peterson & K.J. Kwon-Chung (2014)

Species of fungus

Aspergillus pseudofelis is a species of fungus in the genus Aspergillus. It is from the Fumigati section. Several fungi from this section produce heat-resistant ascospores, and the isolates from this section are frequently obtained from locations where natural fires have previously occurred. The species was first described in 2014.

== Growth and morphology ==
A. pseudofelis has been cultivated on both Czapek yeast extract agar (CYA) plates and Malt Extract Agar Oxoid® (MEAOX) plates. The growth morphology of the colonies can be seen in the pictures below.

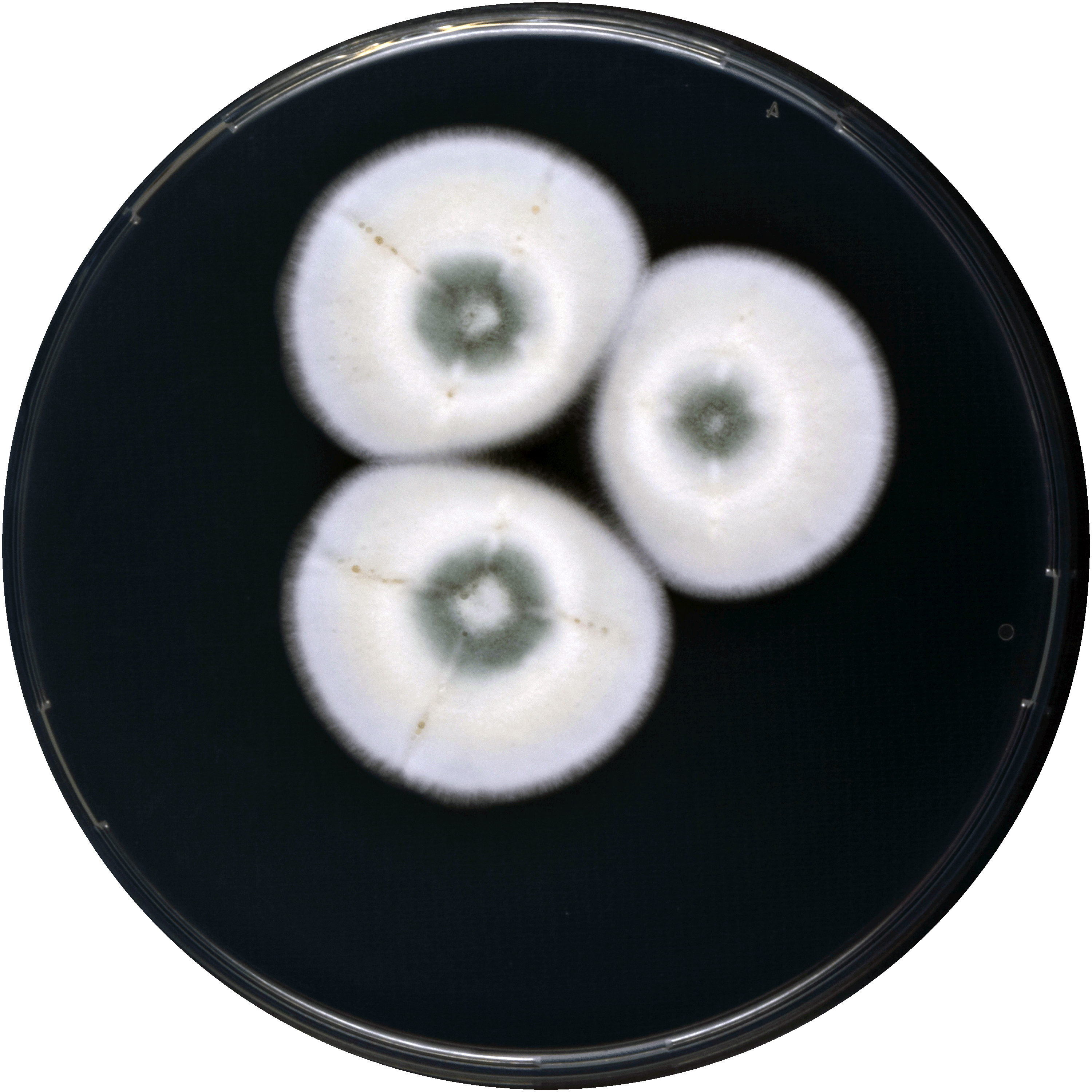
Aspergillus pseudofelis growing on CYA plate

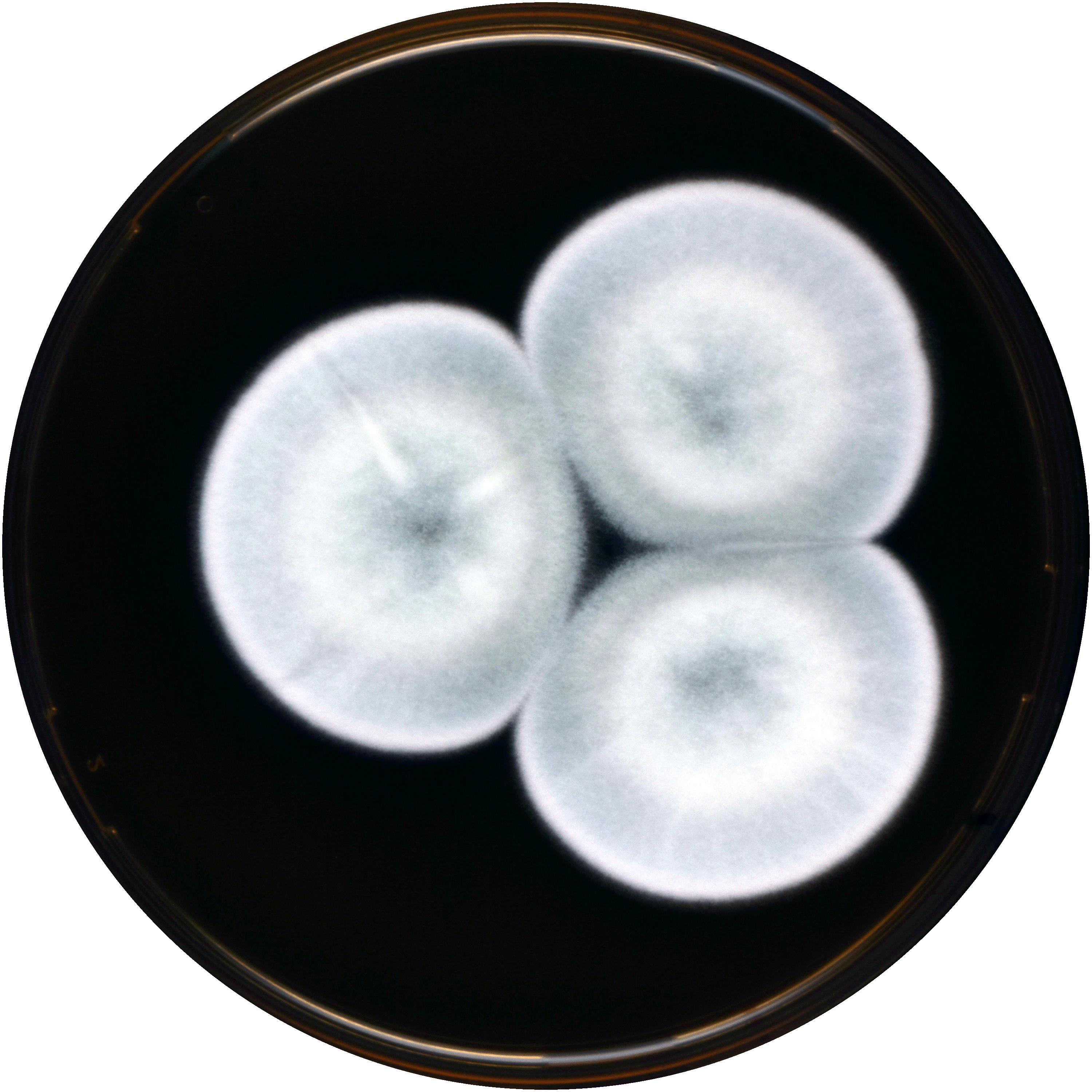
Aspergillus pseudofelis growing on MEAOX plate
