= Aspergillus duricaulis =

Scientific classification
- Kingdom: Fungi
- Division: Ascomycota
- Class: Eurotiomycetes
- Order: Eurotiales
- Family: Aspergillaceae
- Genus: Aspergillus
- Species: A. duricaulis

Binomial name
- Aspergillus duricaulis Raper & Fennell (1965)

Species of fungus

Aspergillus duricaulis is a species of fungus in the genus Aspergillus. It is from the Fumigati section. The species was first described in 1965. It has been reported to produce pseurotin A, fumagillin, asperpentyn, duricaulic acid, asperdurin, phthalides, chromanols, cyclopaldic acid, and 3-O-methylcyclopolic acid.

== Growth and morphology ==
A. duricaulis has been cultivated on both Czapek yeast extract agar (CYA) plates and Malt Extract Agar Oxoid® (MEAOX) plates. The growth morphology of the colonies can be seen in the pictures below.

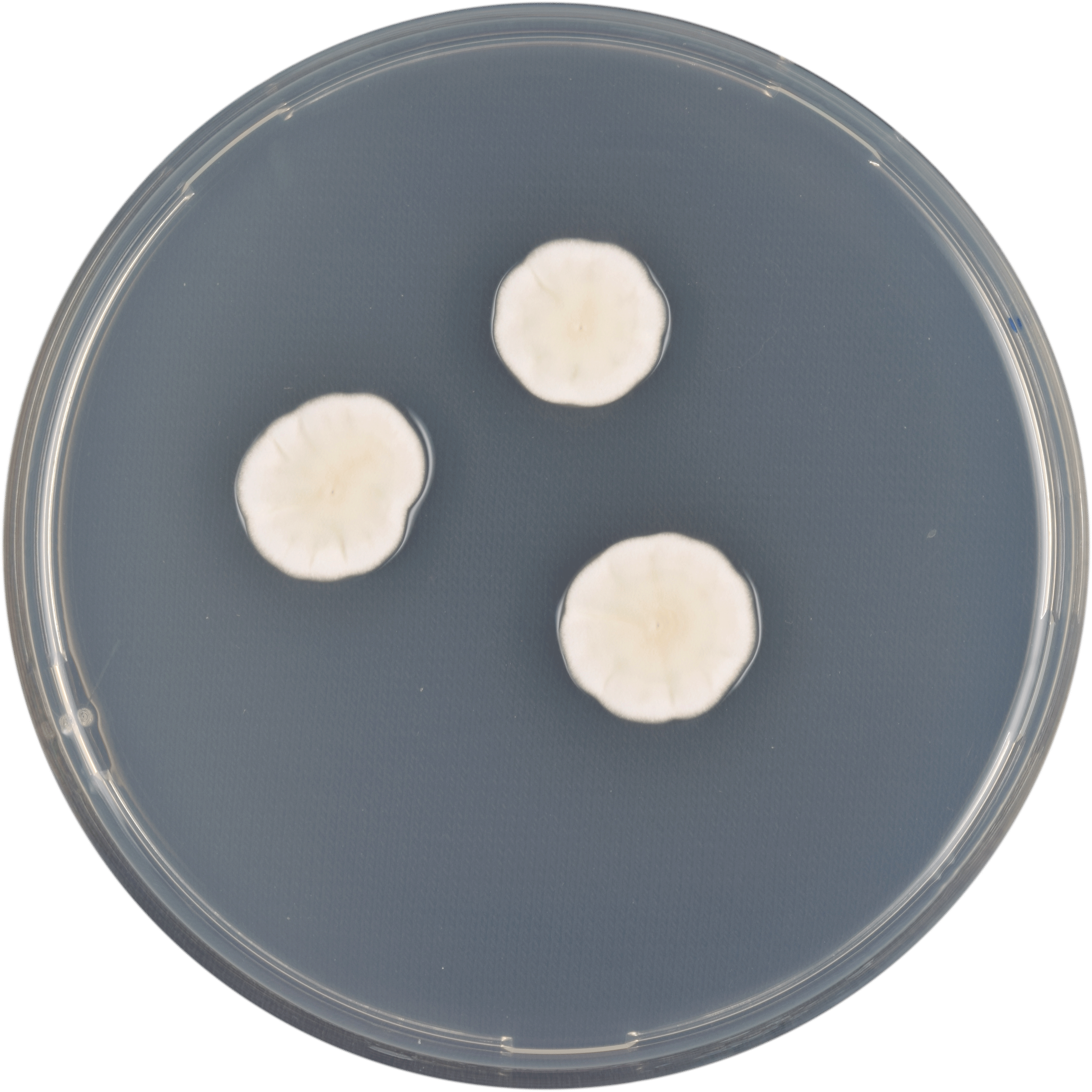
Aspergillus duricaulis growing on CYA plate

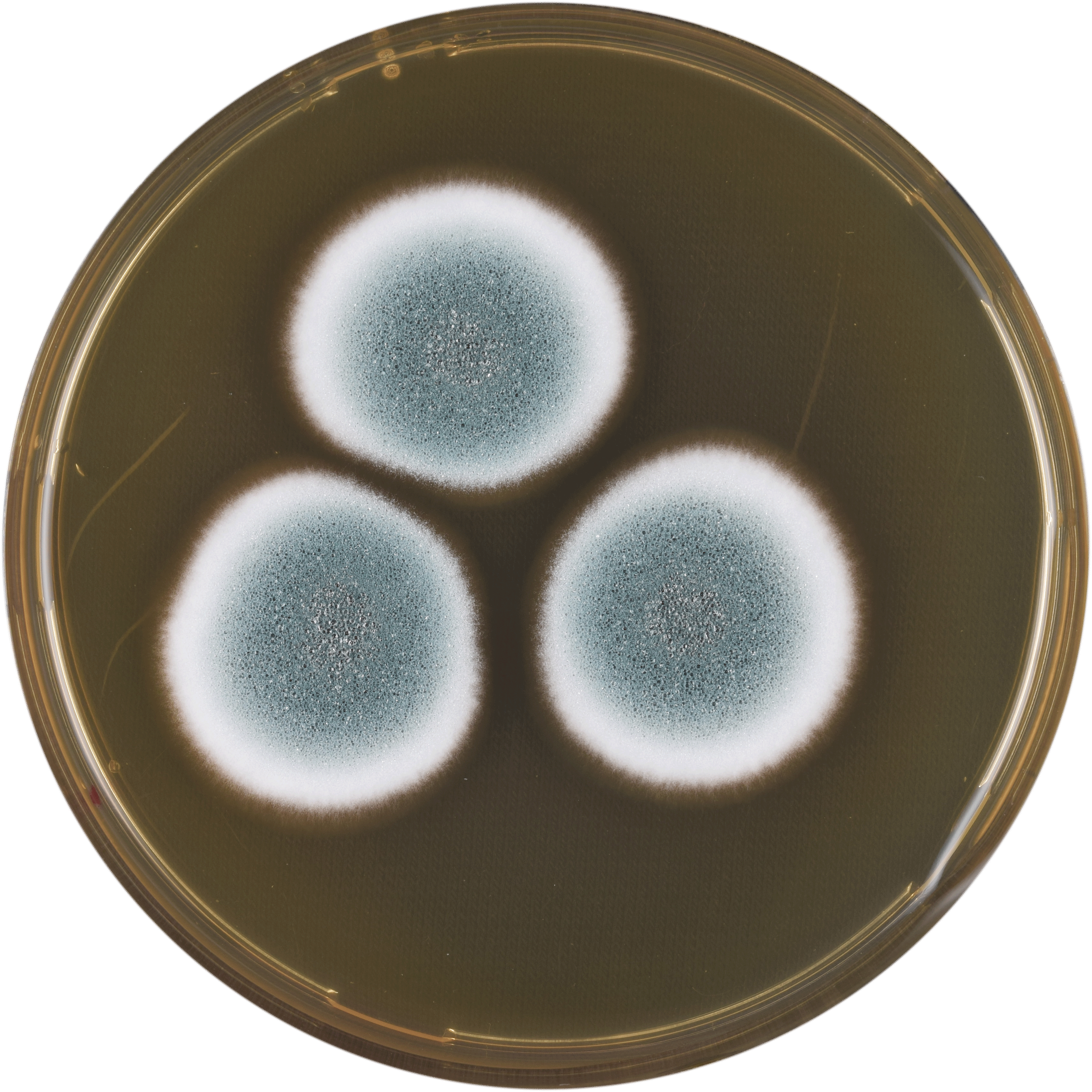
Aspergillus duricaulis growing on MEAOX plate
