= Aspergillus assulatus =

Scientific classification
- Kingdom: Fungi
- Division: Ascomycota
- Class: Eurotiomycetes
- Order: Eurotiales
- Family: Aspergillaceae
- Genus: Aspergillus
- Species: A. assulatus

Binomial name
- Aspergillus assulatus (S.B. Hong, Frisvad & Samson) Houbraken, Visagie & Samson (2014)

Synonyms
- Neosartorya assulata

Species of fungus

Aspergillus assulatus (also named Neosartorya assulata) is a species of fungus in the genus Aspergillus. It is from the Fumigati section. The species was first described in 2014. It has been reported to produce indole alkaloids and apolar metabolites.

== Growth and morphology ==
A. assulatus has been cultivated on both Czapek yeast extract agar (CYA) plates and Malt Extract Agar Oxoid® (MEAOX) plates. The growth morphology of the colonies can be seen in the pictures below.

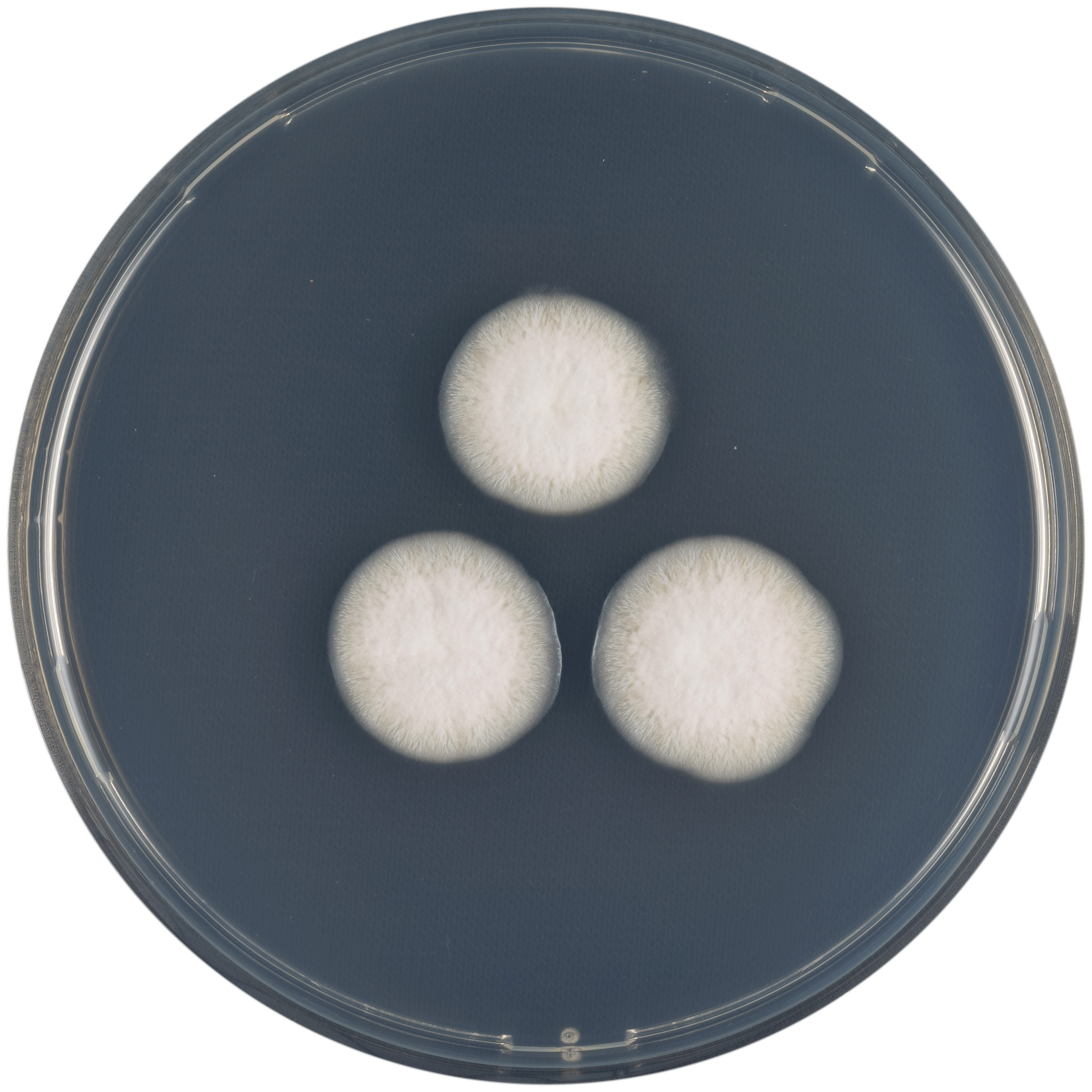
Aspergillus assulatus growing on CYA plate

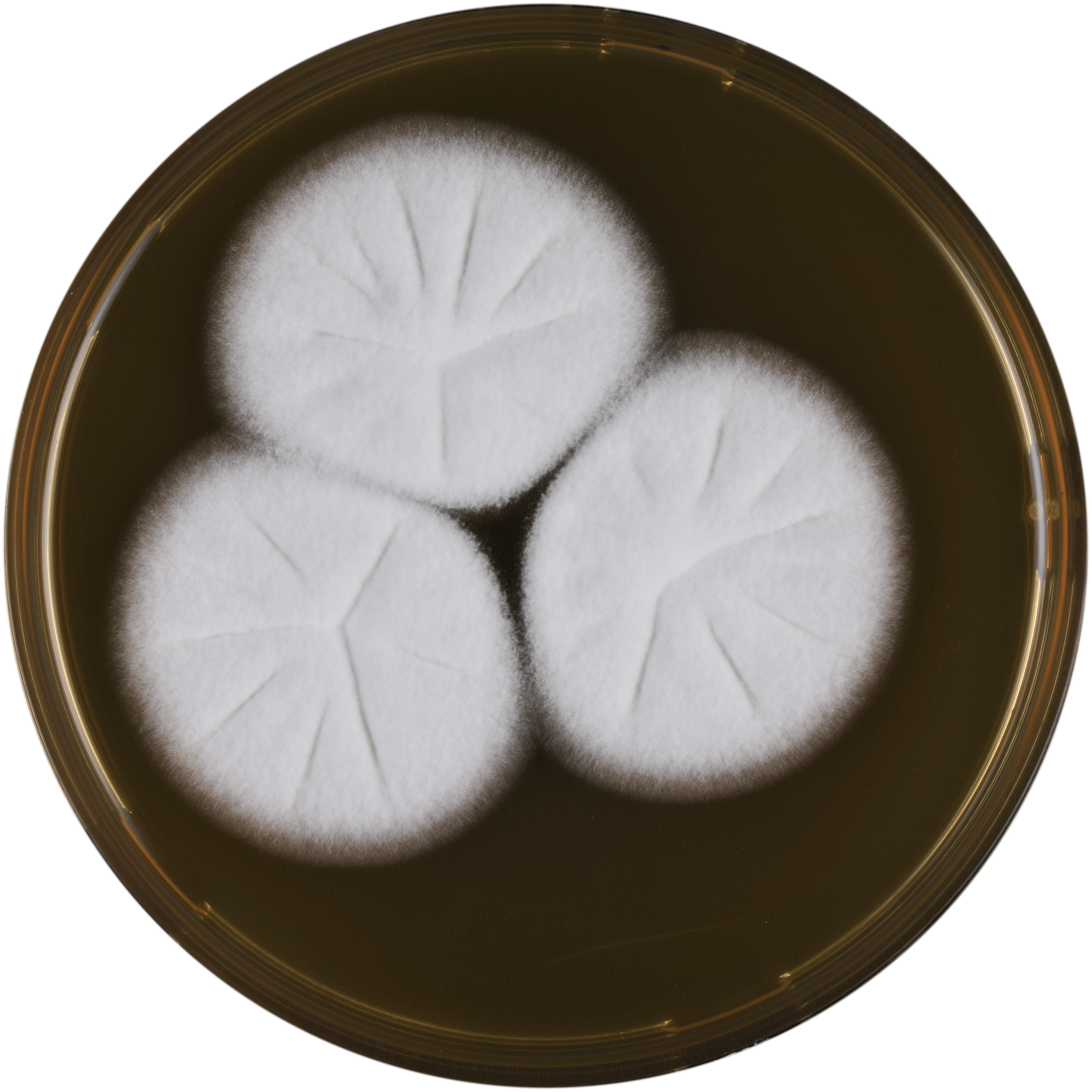
Aspergillus assulatus growing on MEAOX plate
