= Aspergillus neoauricomus =

Scientific classification
- Kingdom: Fungi
- Division: Ascomycota
- Class: Eurotiomycetes
- Order: Eurotiales
- Family: Aspergillaceae
- Genus: Aspergillus
- Species: A. neoauricomus

Binomial name
- Aspergillus neoauricomus

Species of fungus

Aspergillus neoauricomus is a species of fungus in the genus Aspergillus. In 2016, the genome of A. neoauricomus was sequenced as a part of the Aspergillus whole-genome sequencing project - a project dedicated to performing whole-genome sequencing of all members of the genus Aspergillus. The genome assembly size was 36.86 Mbp.

== Growth and morphology ==
Aspergillus neoauricomus has been cultivated on both Czapek yeast extract agar (CYA) plates and Malt Extract Agar Oxoid® (MEAOX) plates. The growth morphology of the colonies can be seen in the pictures below.

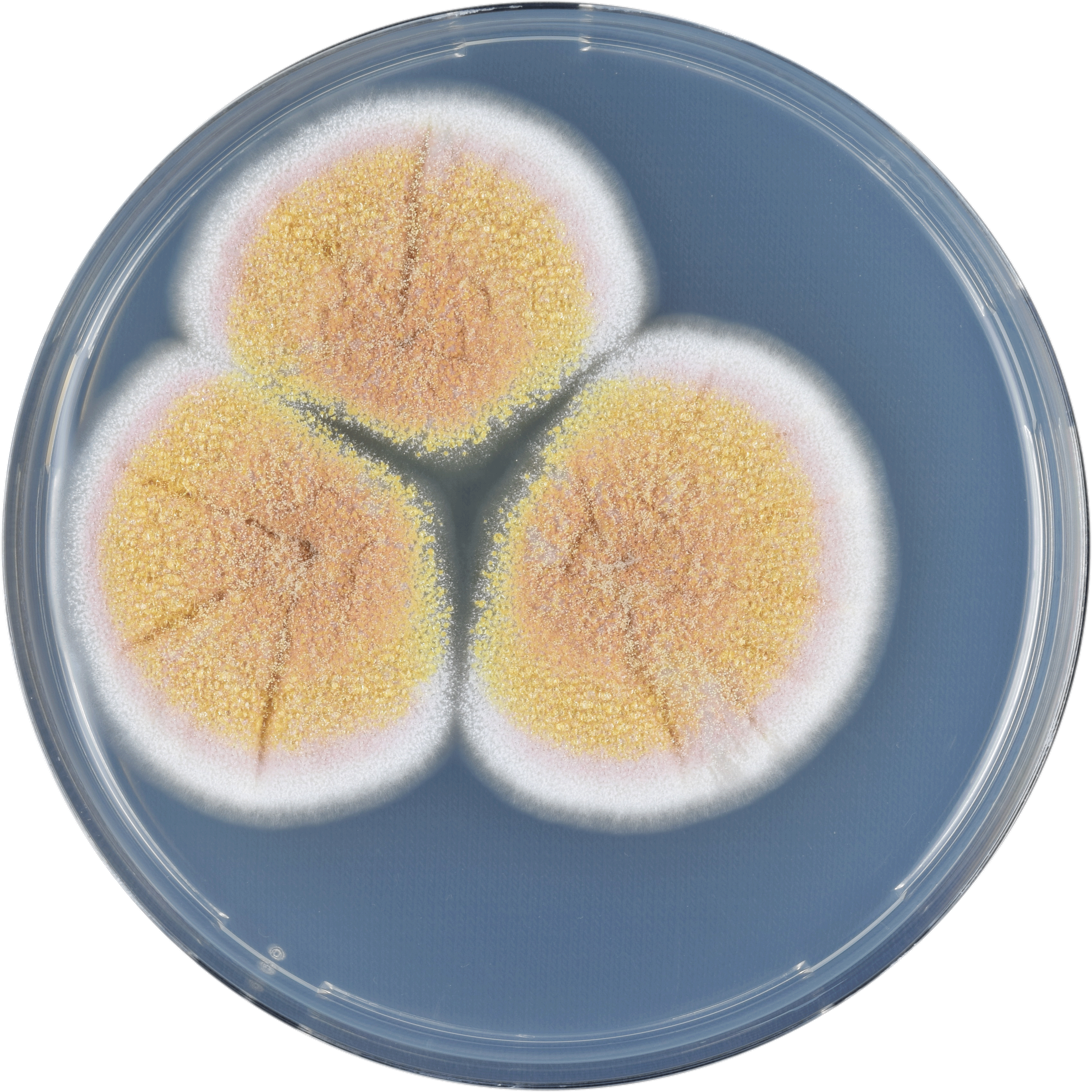
Aspergillus neoauricomus growing on CYA plate

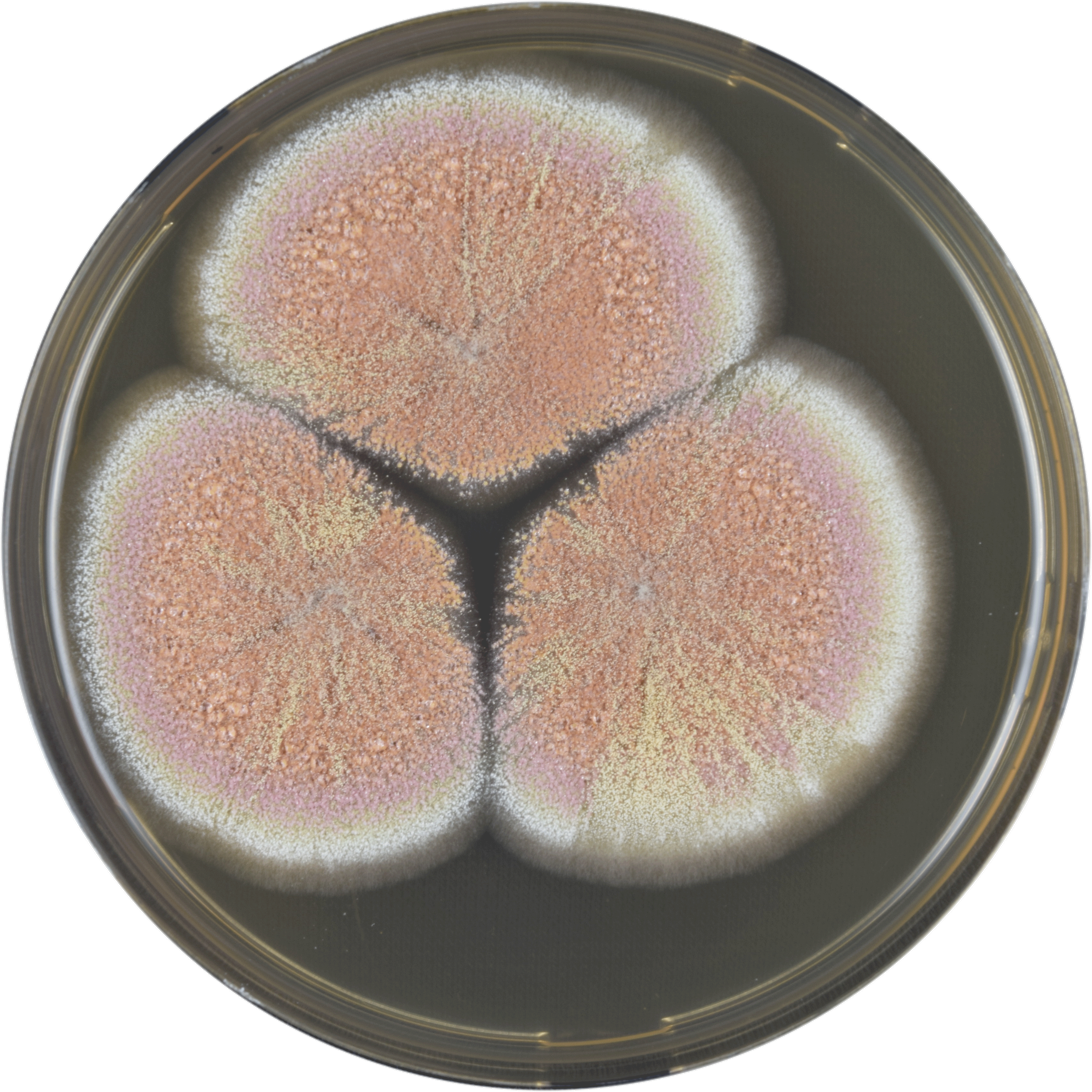
Aspergillus neoauricomus growing on MEAOX plate
