= Aspergillus sloanii =

Scientific classification
- Kingdom: Fungi
- Division: Ascomycota
- Class: Eurotiomycetes
- Order: Eurotiales
- Family: Aspergillaceae
- Genus: Aspergillus
- Species: A. sloanii

Binomial name
- Aspergillus sloanii C.M. Visagie, Y. Hirooka & R.A. Samson (2014)

Species of fungus

Aspergillus sloanii is a species of fungus in the genus Aspergillus. It is from the Aspergillus section. The species was first described in 2014. It has been reported to produce auroglaucin, bisanthrons, dihydroauroglaucin, echinulins, flavoglaucin, physcion, tetracyclic, and tetrahydroauroglaucin.

== Growth and morphology ==
A. sloanii has been cultivated on both Czapek yeast extract agar (CYA) plates and yeast extract sucrose agar (YES) plates. The growth morphology of the colonies can be seen in the pictures below.

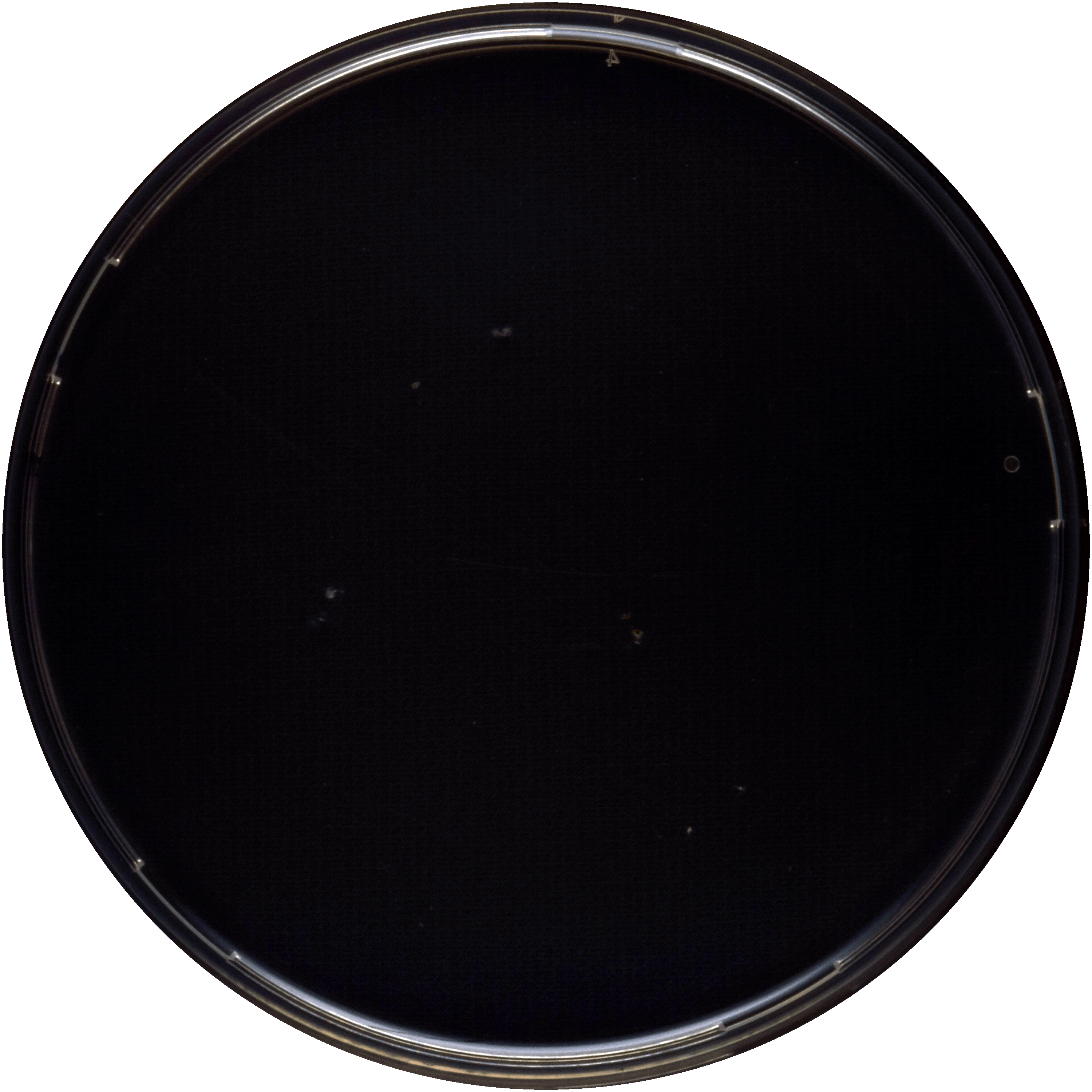
Aspergillus sloanii growing on CYA plate

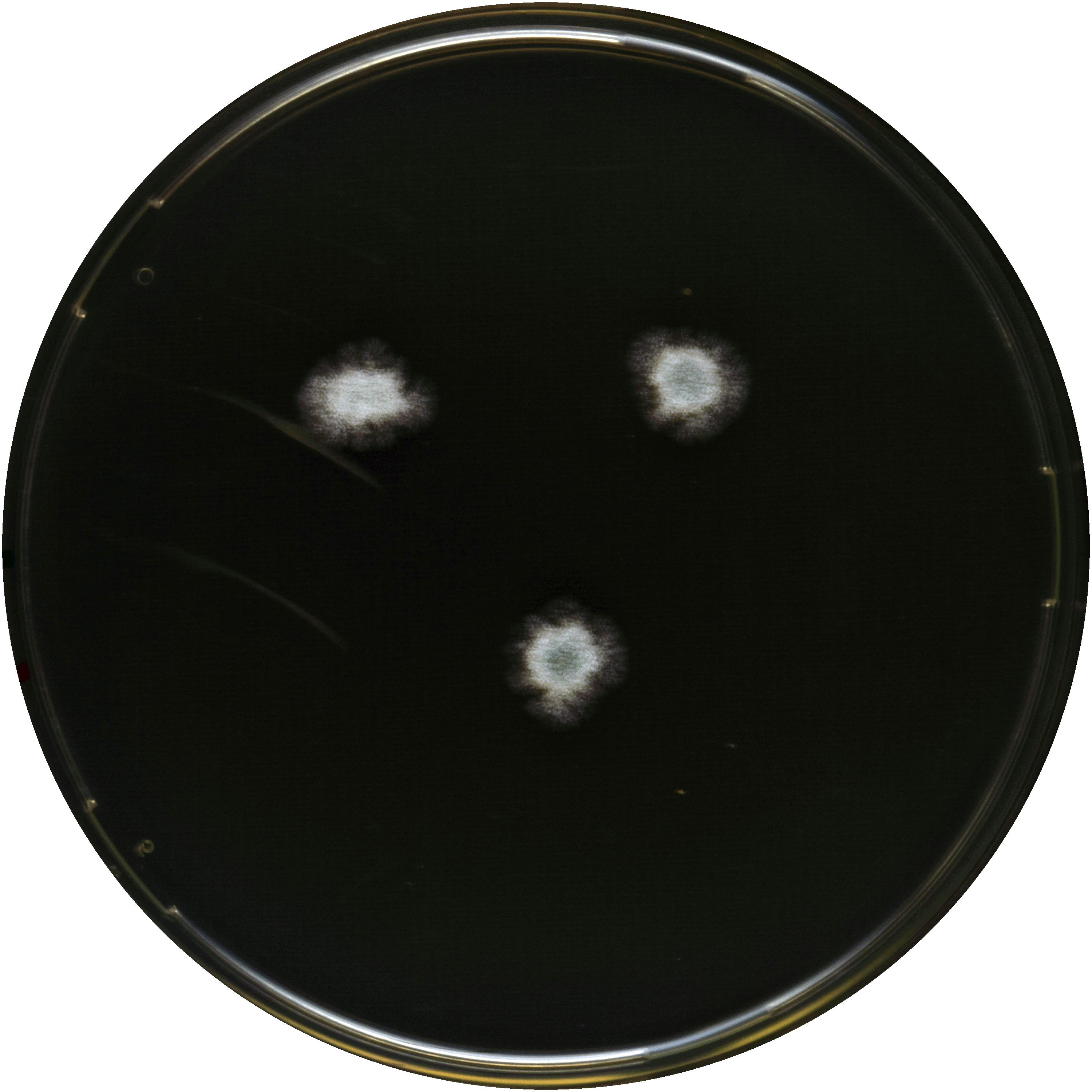
Aspergillus sloanii growing on YES plate
