= Aspergillus fumisynnematus =

Scientific classification
- Kingdom: Fungi
- Division: Ascomycota
- Class: Eurotiomycetes
- Order: Eurotiales
- Family: Aspergillaceae
- Genus: Aspergillus
- Species: A. fumisynnematus

Binomial name
- Aspergillus fumisynnematus Y. Horie, Miyaji, Nishimura, Taguchi & Udagawa (1993)

Species of fungus

Aspergillus fumisynnematus is a species of fungus in the genus Aspergillus. It is from the Fumigati section. The species was first described in 1993. It has been reported to produce neosartorin, pyripyropens, and fumimycin.

== Growth and morphology ==
A. fumisynnematus has been cultivated on both Czapek yeast extract agar (CYA) plates and Malt Extract Agar Oxoid® (MEAOX) plates. The growth morphology of the colonies can be seen in the pictures below.

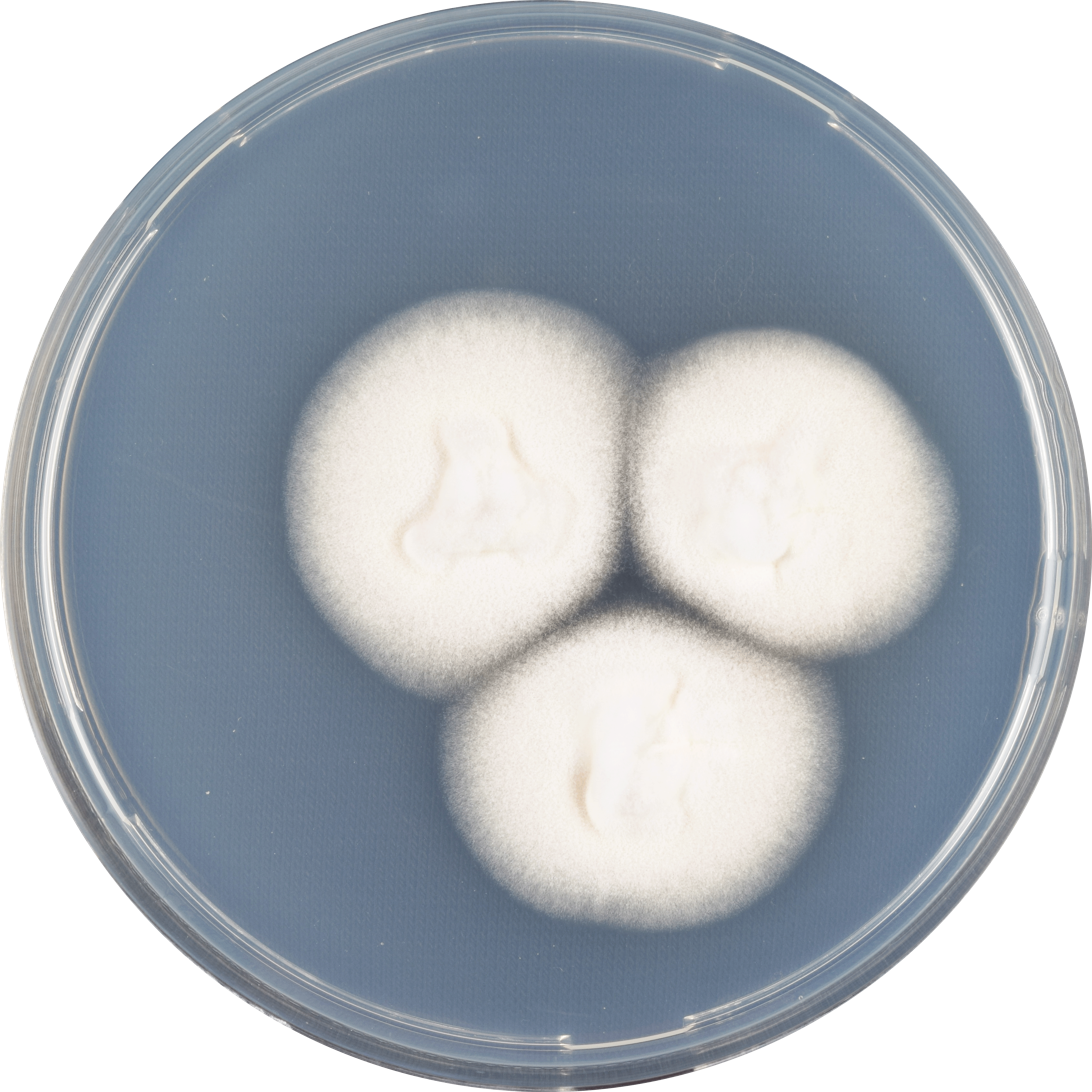
Aspergillus fumisynnematus growing on CYA plate

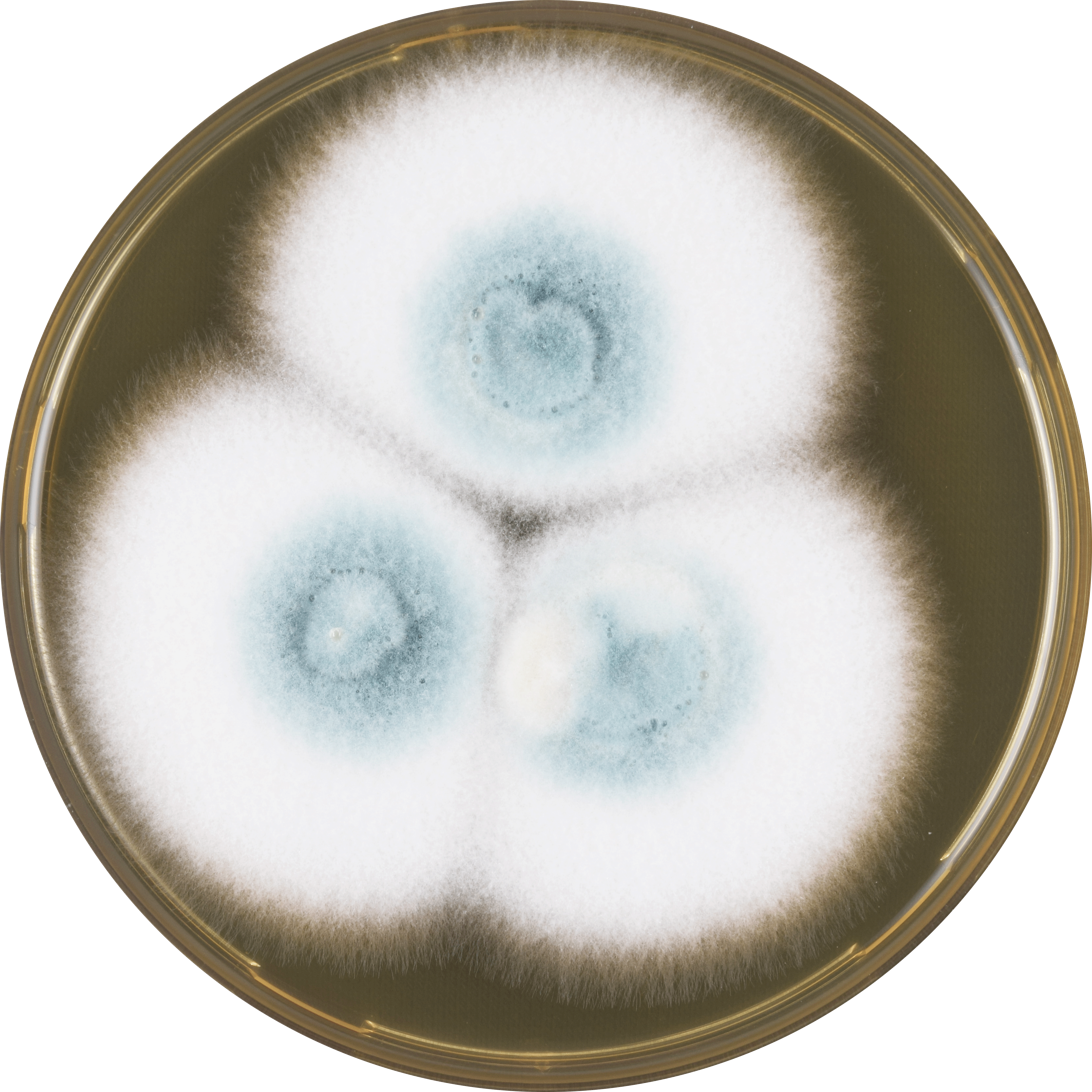
Aspergillus fumisynnematus growing on MEAOX plate
