= Aspergillus labruscus =

Scientific classification
- Kingdom: Fungi
- Division: Ascomycota
- Class: Eurotiomycetes
- Order: Eurotiales
- Family: Aspergillaceae
- Genus: Aspergillus
- Species: A. labruscus

Binomial name
- Aspergillus labruscus Fungaro, Sartori, Ferranti, Frisvad, Taniwaki & Iamanaka (2017)

Species of fungus

Aspergillus labruscus is a species of fungus in the genus Aspergillus. It belongs to the group of black Aspergilli that are used in industry to create enzymes and other products. It is from the Nigri section. The species was first described in 2017.

== Growth and morphology ==
A. labruscus has been cultivated on both Czapek yeast extract agar (CYA) plates and Malt Extract Agar Oxoid® (MEAOX) plates. The growth morphology of the colonies can be seen in the pictures below.

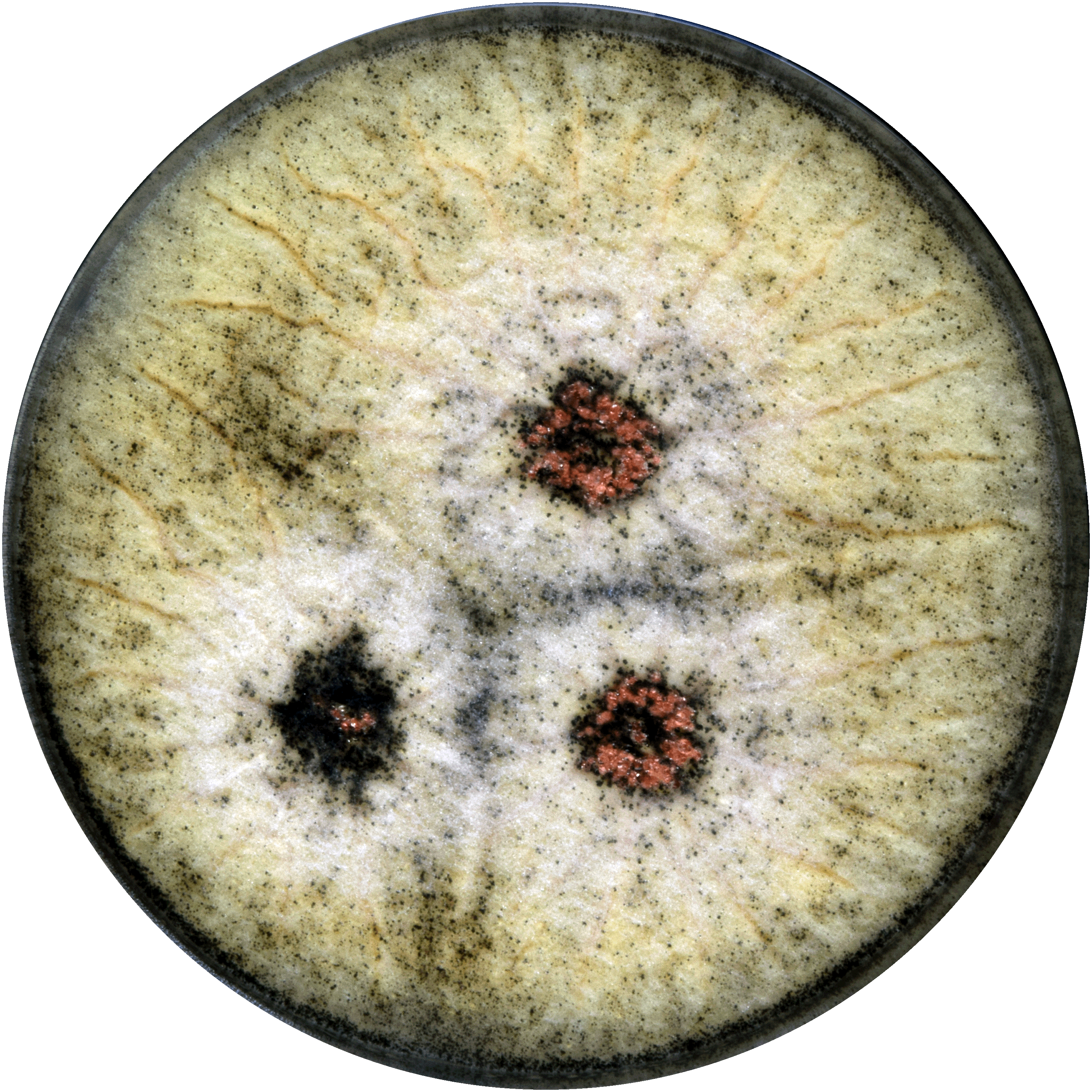
Aspergillus labruscus growing on CYA plate

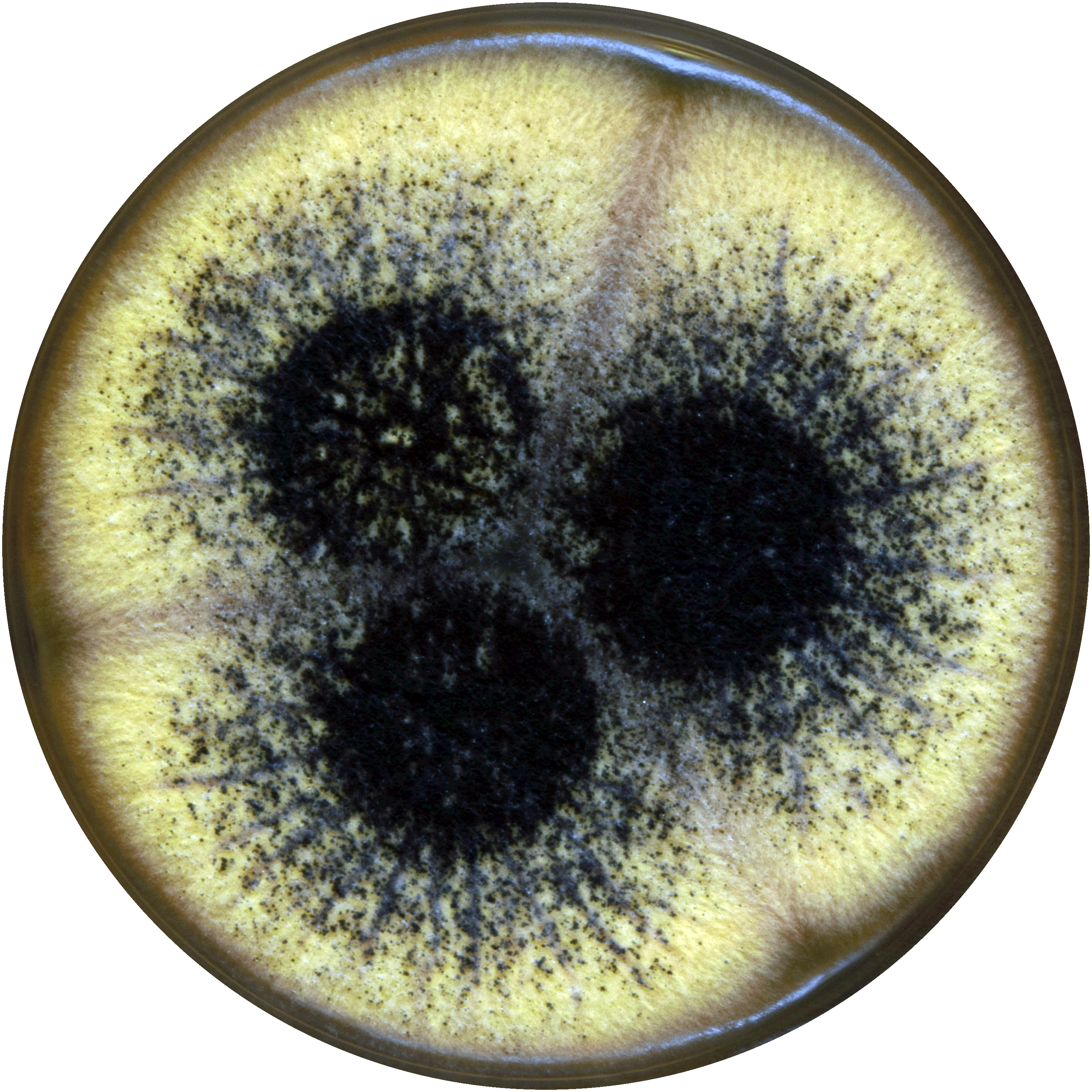
Aspergillus labruscus growing on MEAOX plate
