= Aspergillus chinensis =

Scientific classification
- Kingdom: Fungi
- Division: Ascomycota
- Class: Eurotiomycetes
- Order: Eurotiales
- Family: Aspergillaceae
- Genus: Aspergillus
- Species: A. chinensis

Binomial name
- Aspergillus chinensis Samson, Visagie & Houbraken (2014)

Synonyms
- Aspergillus filifer

Species of fungus

Aspergillus chinensis (also named Aspergillus filifer) is a species of fungus in the genus Aspergillus. It is from the Nidulantes section. The species was first described in 2014. It has been reported to produce shamixanthones and varitriol.

== Growth and morphology ==
A. chinensis has been cultivated on both Czapek yeast extract agar (CYA) plates and Malt Extract Agar Oxoid® (MEAOX) plates. The growth morphology of the colonies can be seen in the pictures below.

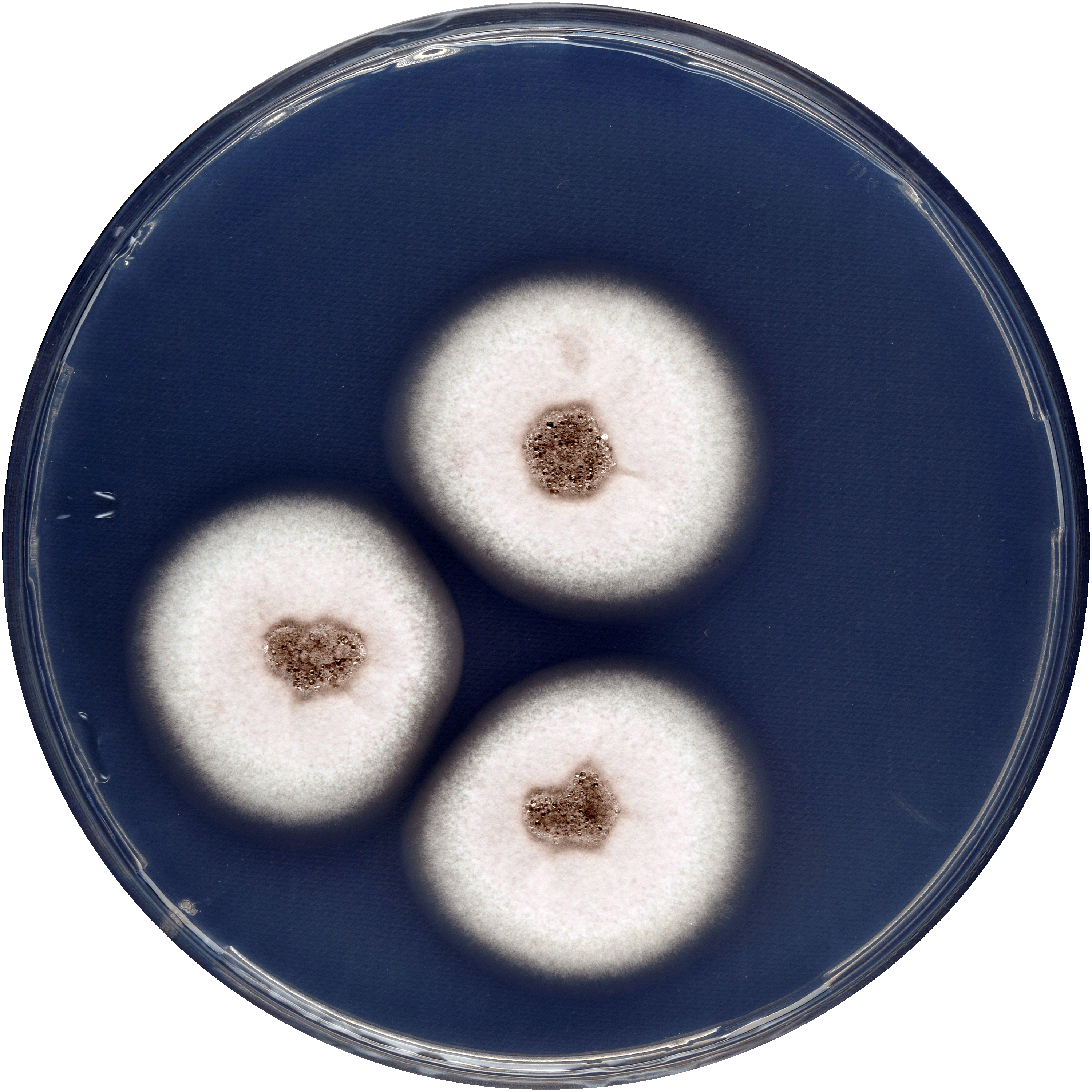
Aspergillus chinensis growing on CYA plate

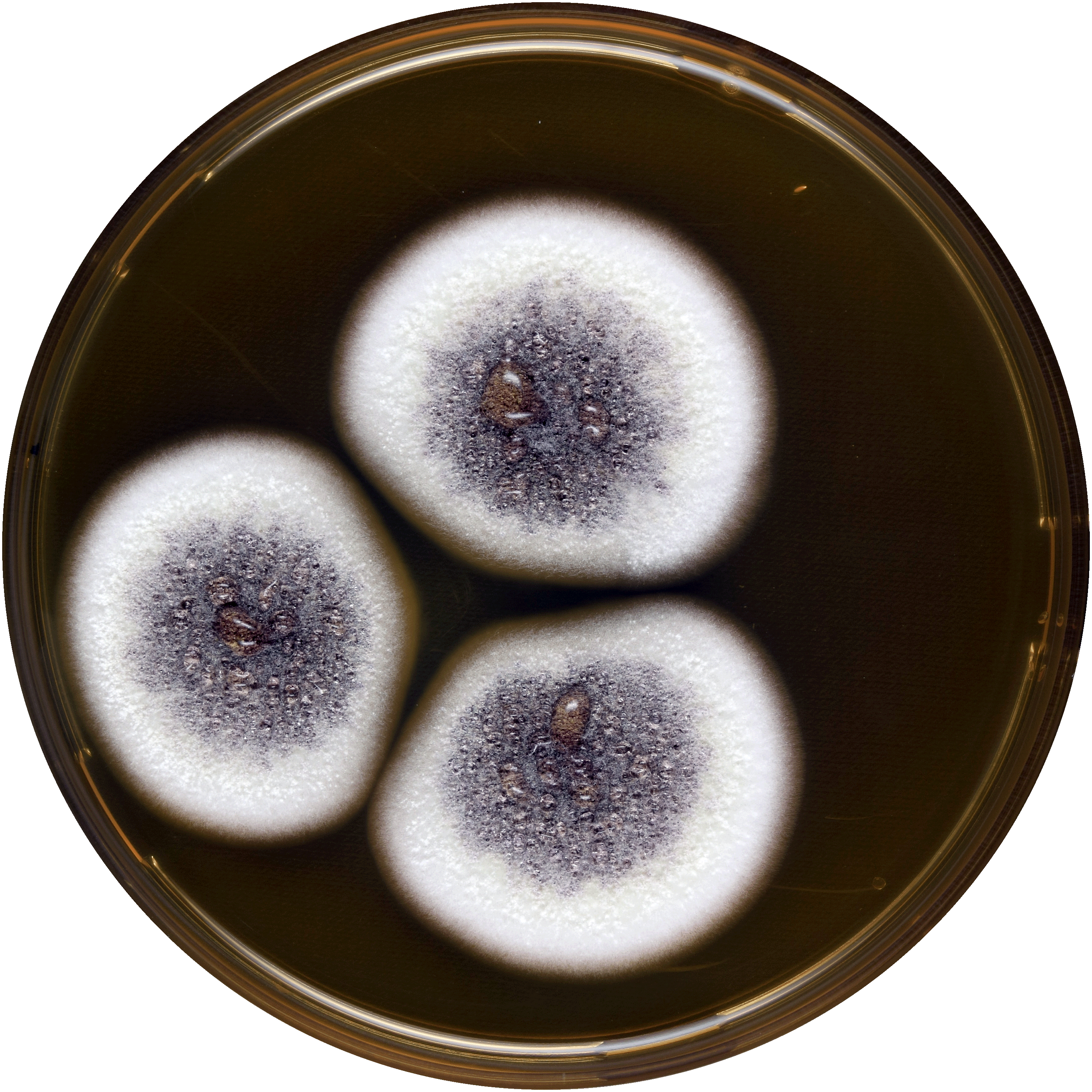
Aspergillus chinensis growing on MEAOX plate
