= Aspergillus trinidadensis =

Scientific classification
- Kingdom: Fungi
- Division: Ascomycota
- Class: Eurotiomycetes
- Order: Eurotiales
- Family: Aspergillaceae
- Genus: Aspergillus
- Species: A. trinidadensis

Binomial name
- Aspergillus trinidadensis Jurjević, G. Perrone & S.W. Peterson (2012)

Species of fungus

Aspergillus trinidadensis is a species of fungus in the genus Aspergillus. It belongs to the group of black Aspergilli that are used in industry to create enzymes and other products. It is from the Nigri section. The species was first described in 2012.

== Growth and morphology ==
A. trinidadensis has been cultivated on both Czapek yeast extract agar (CYA) plates and Malt Extract Agar Oxoid® (MEAOX) plates. The growth morphology of the colonies can be seen in the pictures below.

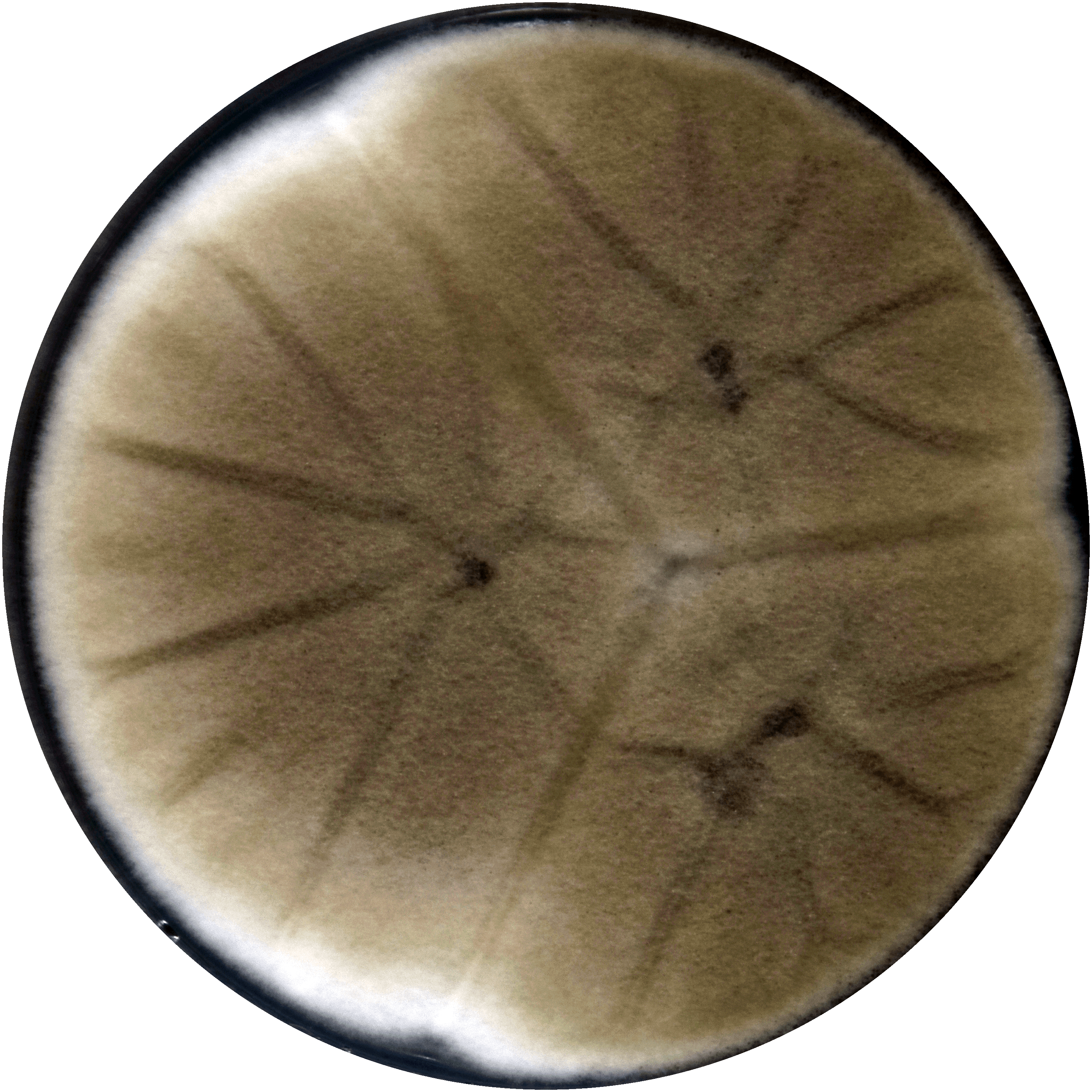
Aspergillus trinidadensis growing on CYA plate

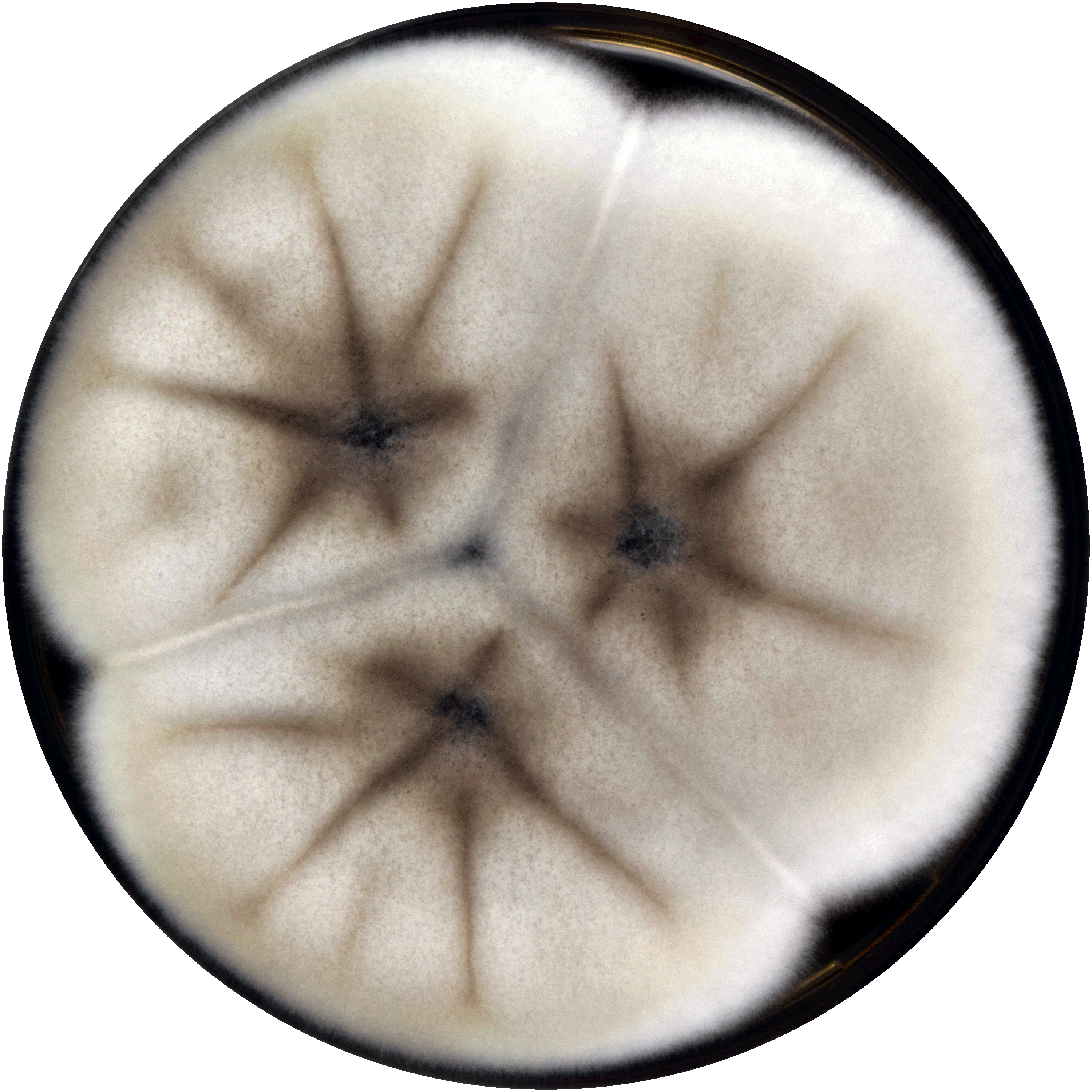
Aspergillus trinidadensis growing on MEAOX plate
