= Aspergillus kanagawaensis =

Scientific classification
- Kingdom: Fungi
- Division: Ascomycota
- Class: Eurotiomycetes
- Order: Eurotiales
- Family: Aspergillaceae
- Genus: Aspergillus
- Species: A. kanagawaensis

Binomial name
- Aspergillus kanagawaensis Nehira (1951)

Species of fungus

Aspergillus kanagawaensis is a species of fungus in the genus Aspergillus. It is from the Cervini section. The species was first described in 1951. It has been reported to a few extrolites, including two polar indol-alkaloids and one polar indol-alkaloid.

== Growth and morphology ==
A. kanagawaensis has been cultivated on both Czapek yeast extract agar (CYA) plates and Malt Extract Agar Oxoid® (MEAOX) plates. The growth morphology of the colonies can be seen in the pictures below.

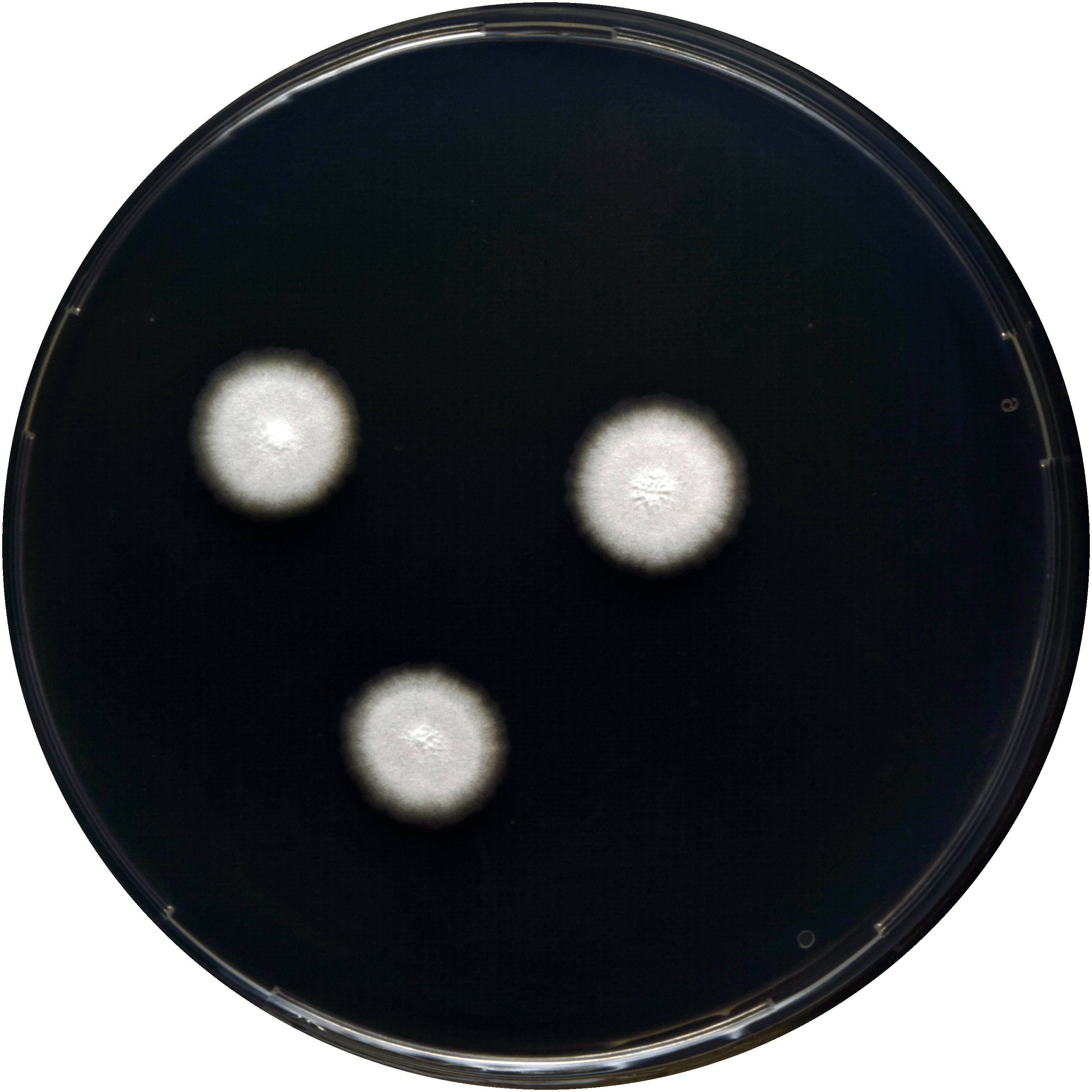
Aspergillus kanagawaensis growing on CYA plate

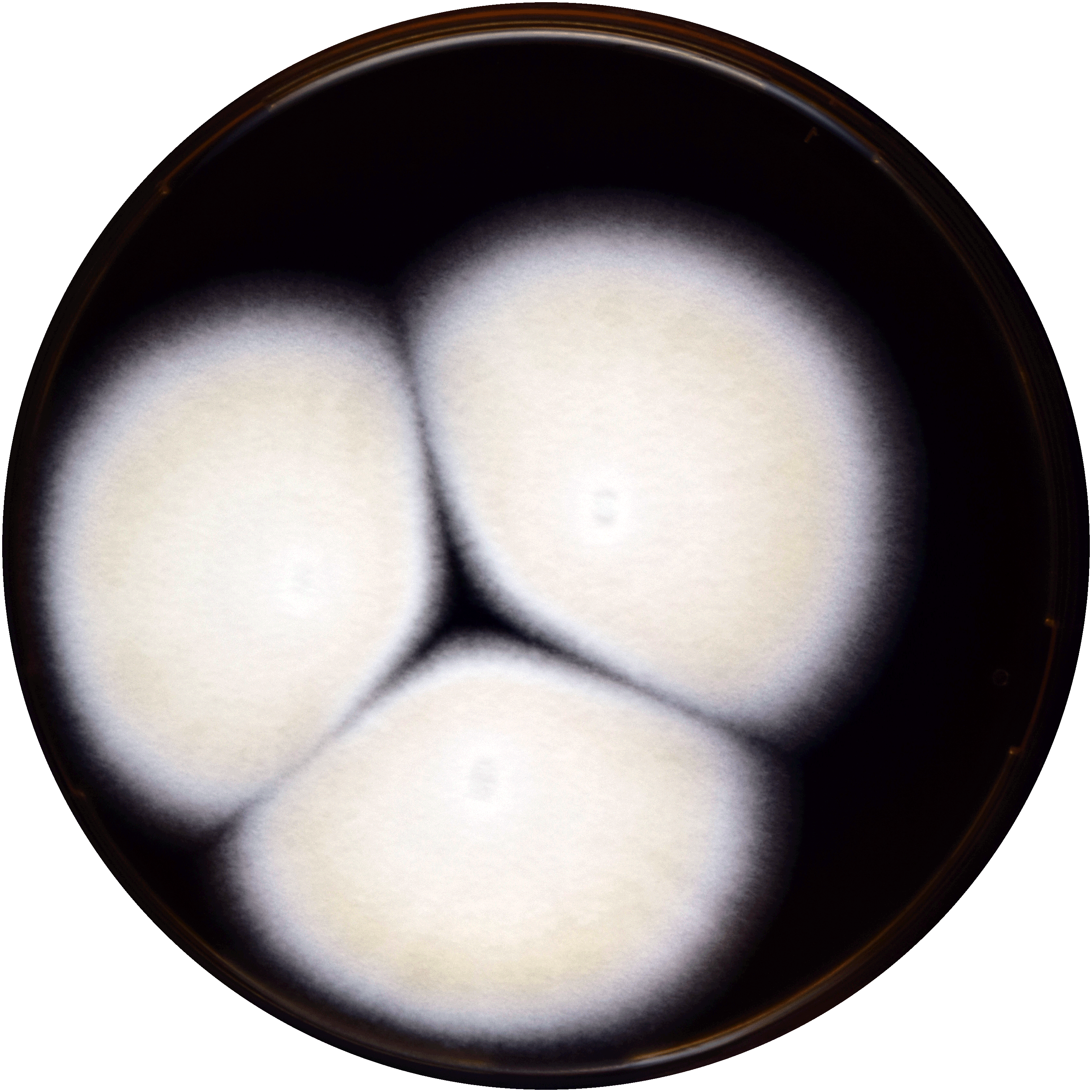
Aspergillus kanagawaensis growing on MEAOX plate
