= Aspergillus arcoverdensis =

Scientific classification
- Kingdom: Fungi
- Division: Ascomycota
- Class: Eurotiomycetes
- Order: Eurotiales
- Family: Aspergillaceae
- Genus: Aspergillus
- Species: A. arcoverdensis

Binomial name
- Aspergillus arcoverdensis Y. Horie, Matsuzawa, Yaguchi & Camp.-Takaki (2015)

Species of fungus

Aspergillus arcoverdensis is a species of fungus in the genus Aspergillus. It is from the Fumigati section. The species was first described in 2015.

== Growth and morphology ==
A. arcoverdensis has been cultivated on both Czapek yeast extract agar (CYA) plates and Malt Extract Agar Oxoid® (MEAOX) plates. The growth morphology of the colonies can be seen in the pictures below.

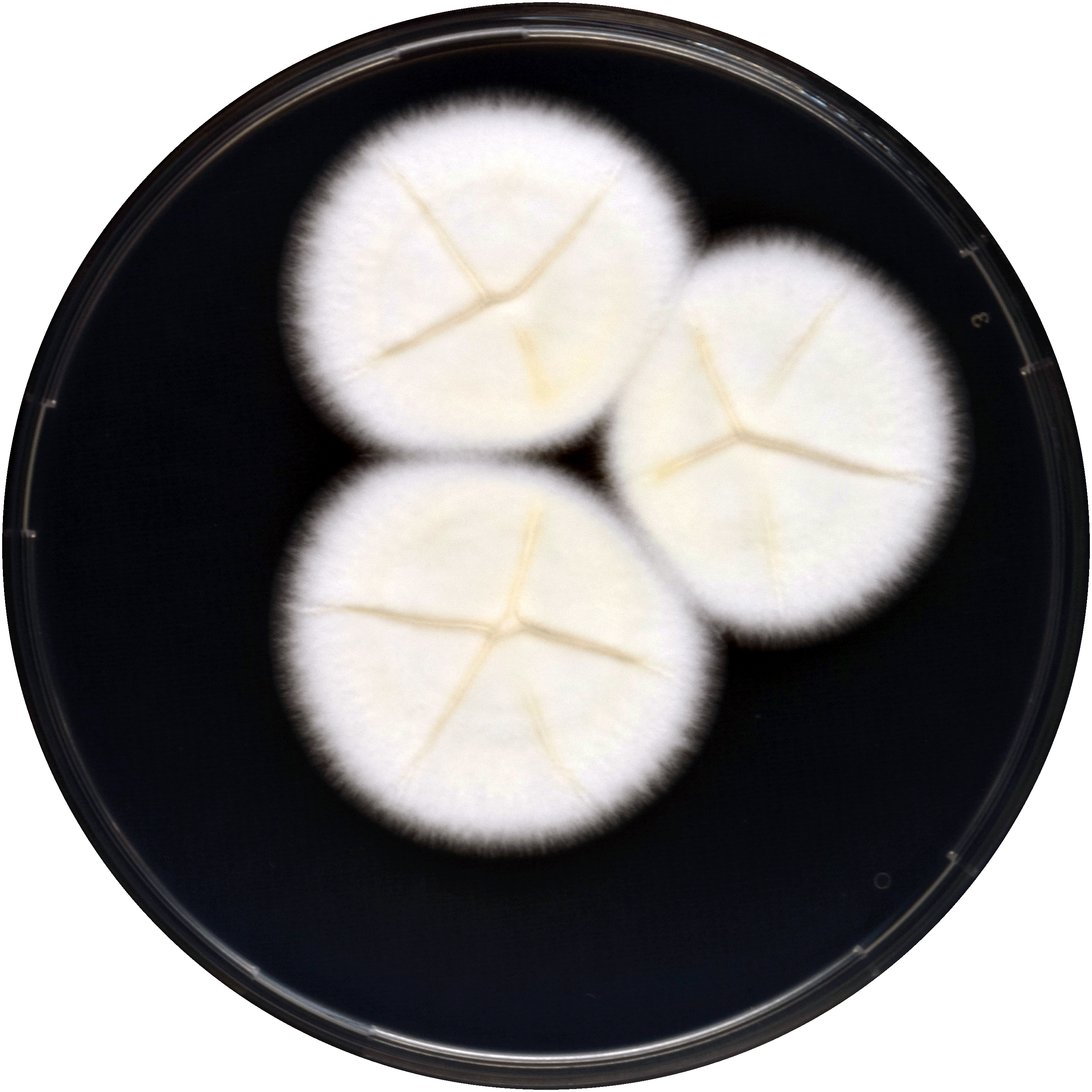
Aspergillus arcoverdensis growing on CYA plate

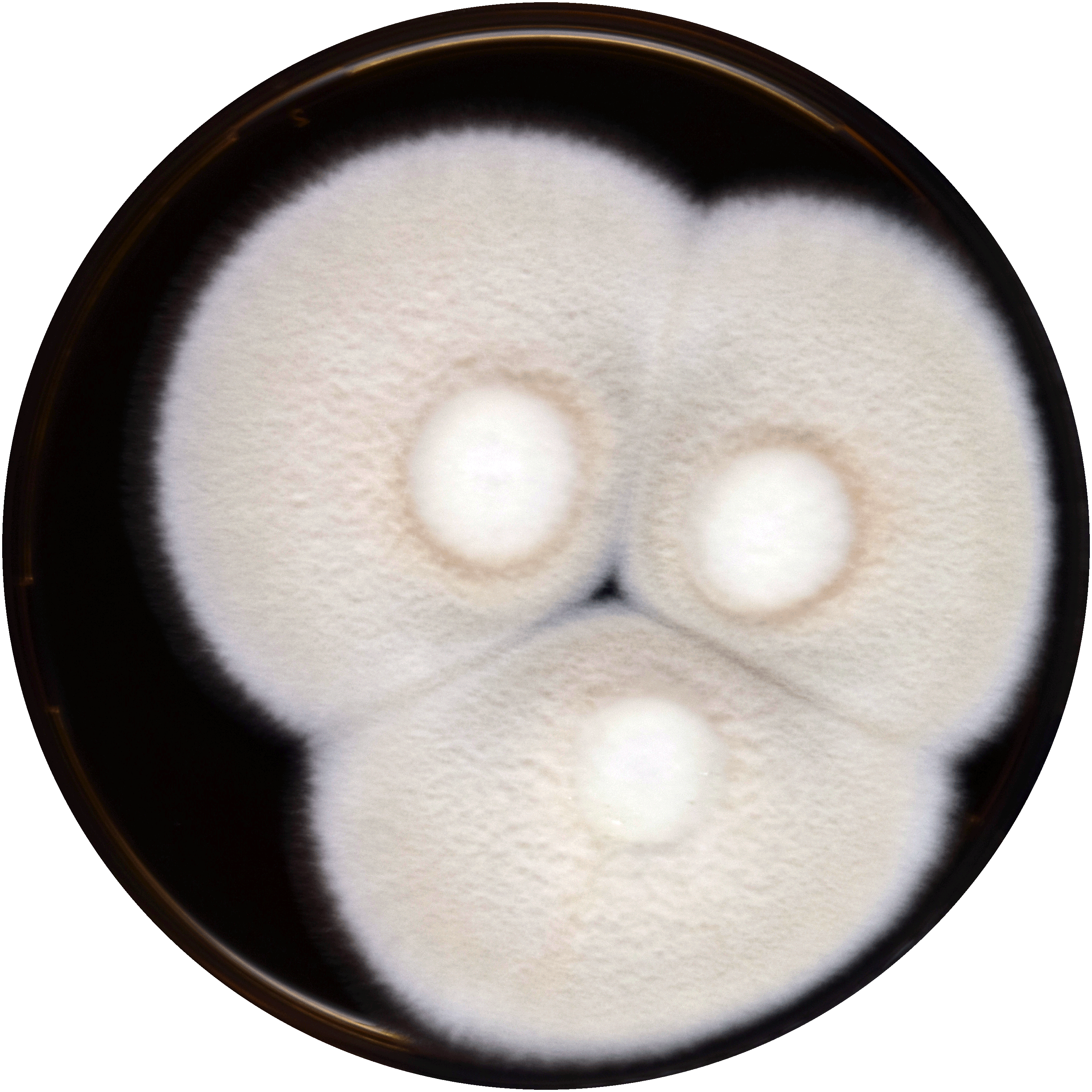
Aspergillus arcoverdensis growing in MEAOX plate
