= Aspergillus flocculosus =

Scientific classification
- Kingdom: Fungi
- Division: Ascomycota
- Class: Eurotiomycetes
- Order: Eurotiales
- Family: Aspergillaceae
- Genus: Aspergillus
- Species: A. flocculosus

Binomial name
- Aspergillus flocculosus Frisvad & Samson (2004)

Species of fungus

Aspergillus flocculosus is a species of fungus in the genus Aspergillus. It is from the Circumdati section. The species was first described in 2004. It has been isolated in Venezuela, Slovenia, Greece, Costa Rica, and Brazil.

== Growth and morphology ==
A. flocculosus has been cultivated on both Czapek yeast extract agar (CYA) plates and Malt Extract Agar Oxoid® (MEAOX) plates. The growth morphology of the colonies can be seen in the pictures below.

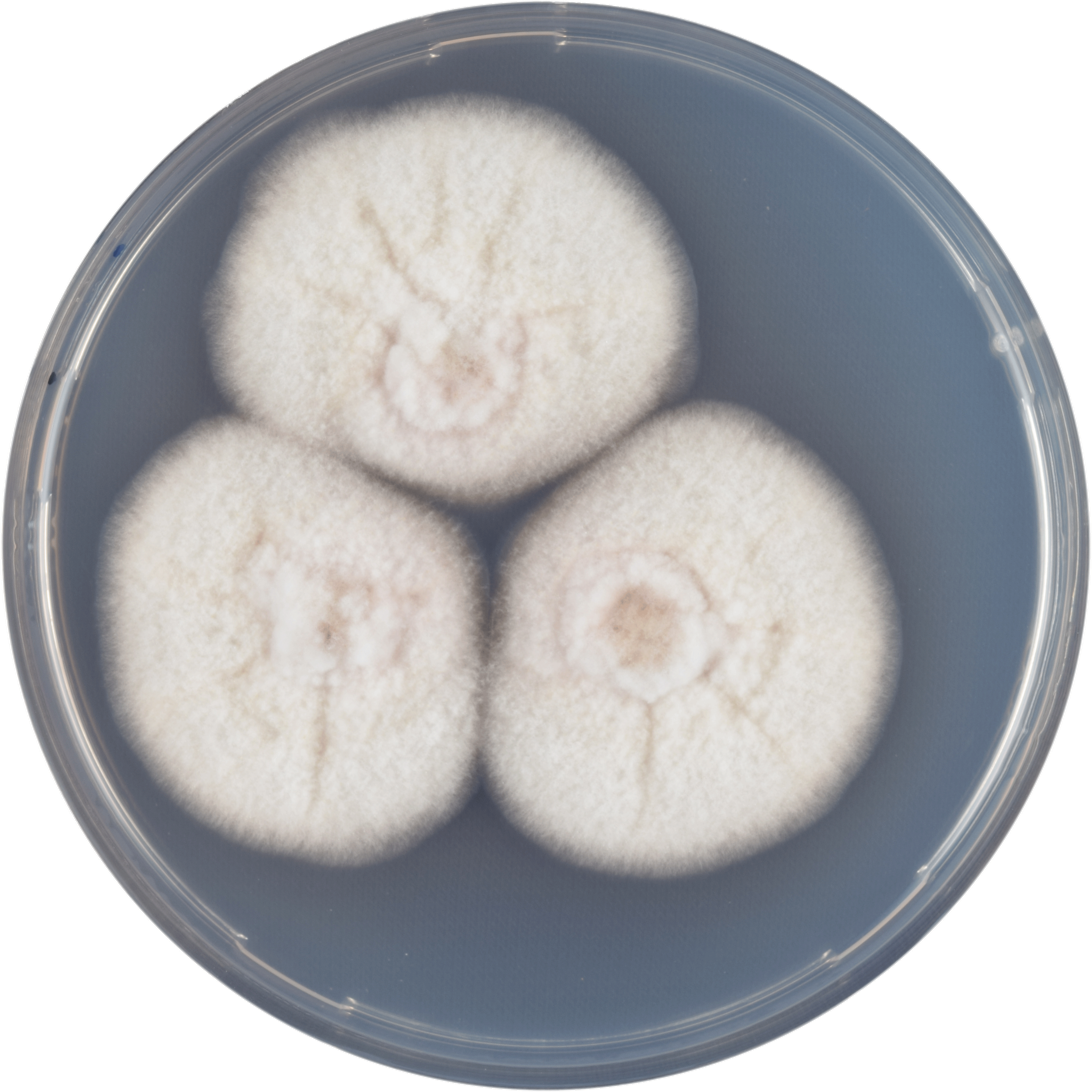
Aspergillus flocculosus growing on CYA plate

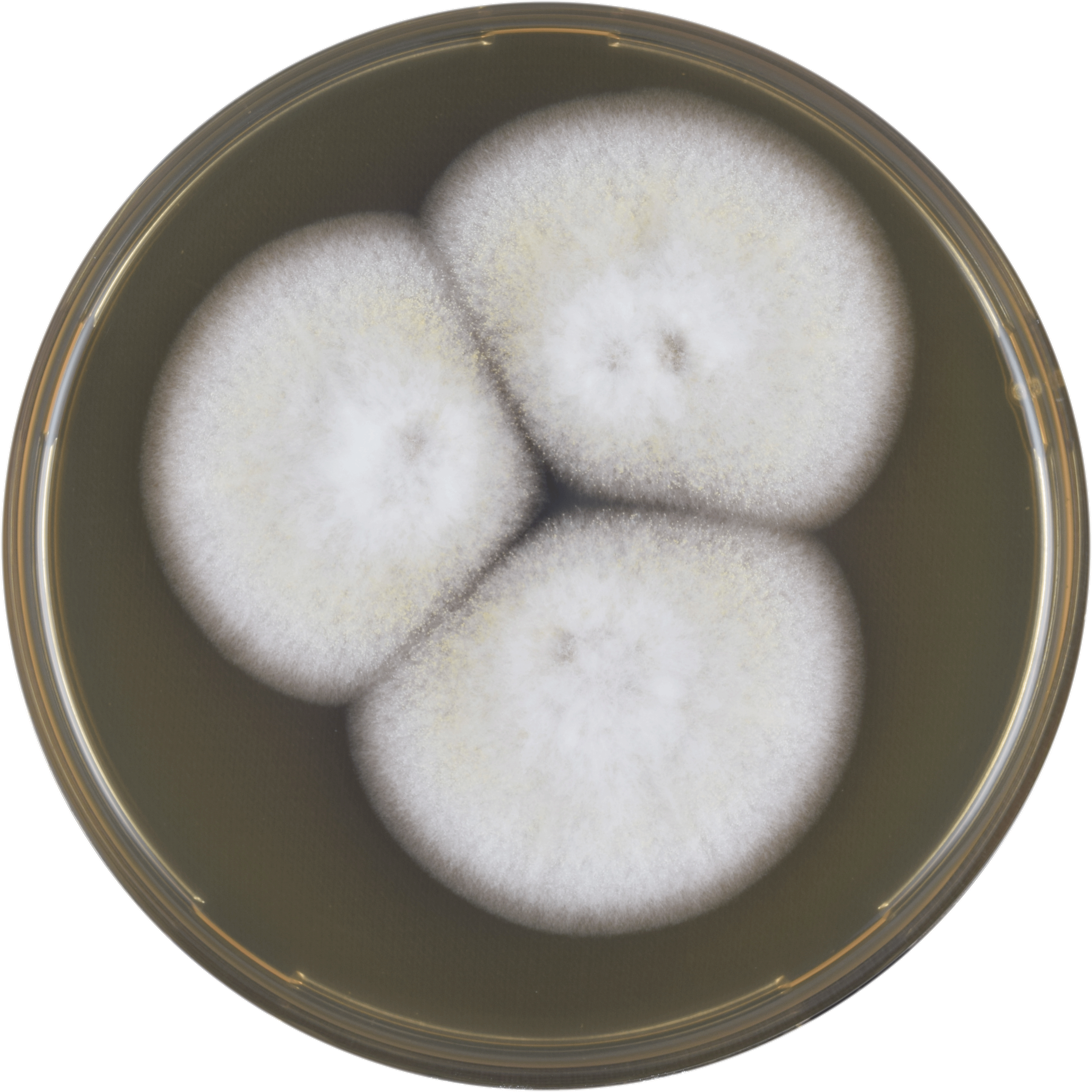
Aspergillus flocculosus growing on MEAOX plate
