= Aspergillus floridensis =

Scientific classification
- Kingdom: Fungi
- Division: Ascomycota
- Class: Eurotiomycetes
- Order: Eurotiales
- Family: Aspergillaceae
- Genus: Aspergillus
- Species: A. floridensis

Binomial name
- Aspergillus floridensis Jurjević, G. Perrone & S.W. Peterson (2012)

Species of fungus

Aspergillus floridensis is a species of fungus in the genus Aspergillus. It belongs to the group of black Aspergilli that are used in industry to create enzymes and other products. It is from the Nigri section. The species was first described in 2012.

== Growth and morphology ==
A. floridensis has been cultivated on both Czapek yeast extract agar (CYA) plates and Malt Extract Agar Oxoid® (MEAOX) plates. The growth morphology of the colonies can be seen in the pictures below.

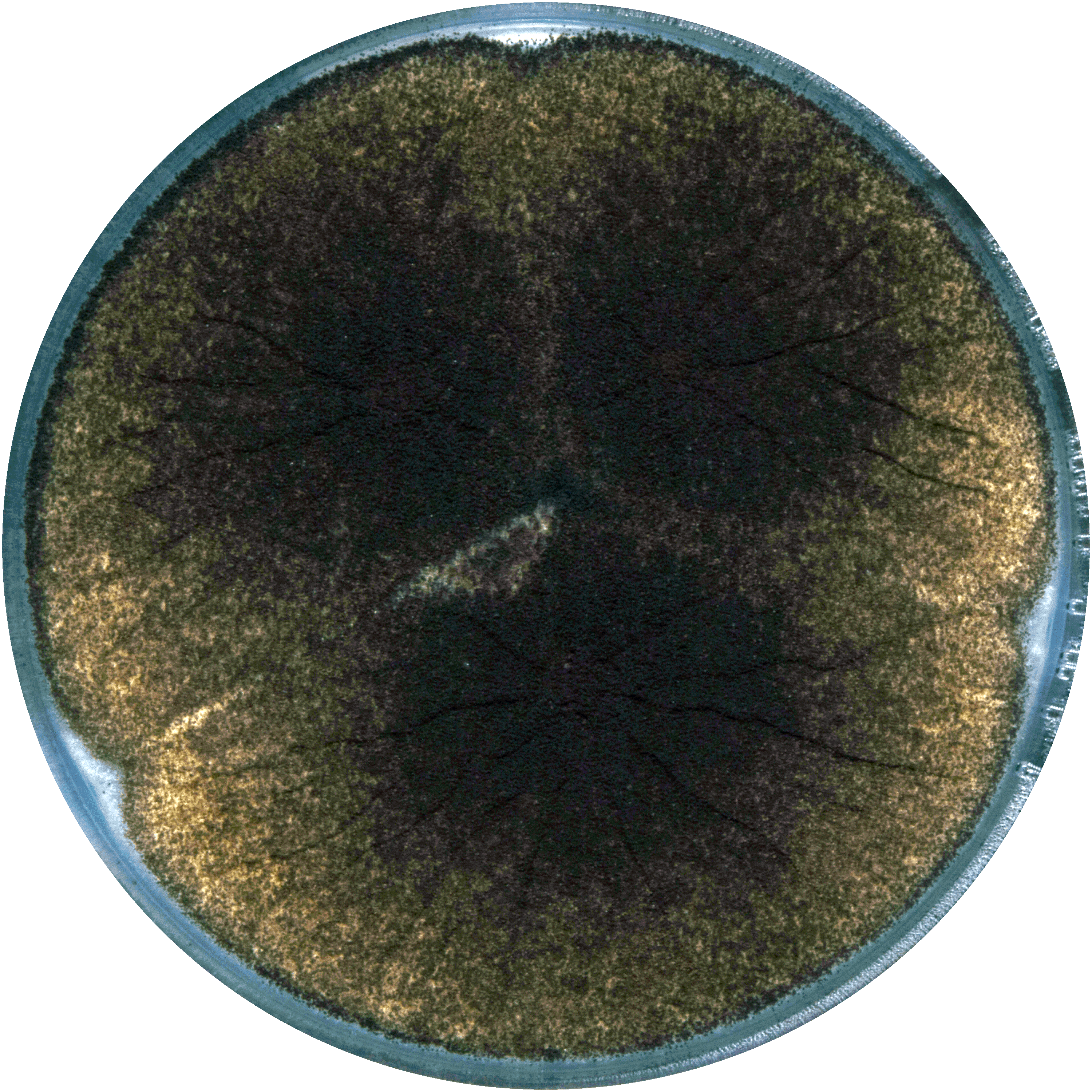
Aspergillus floridensis growing on CYA plate

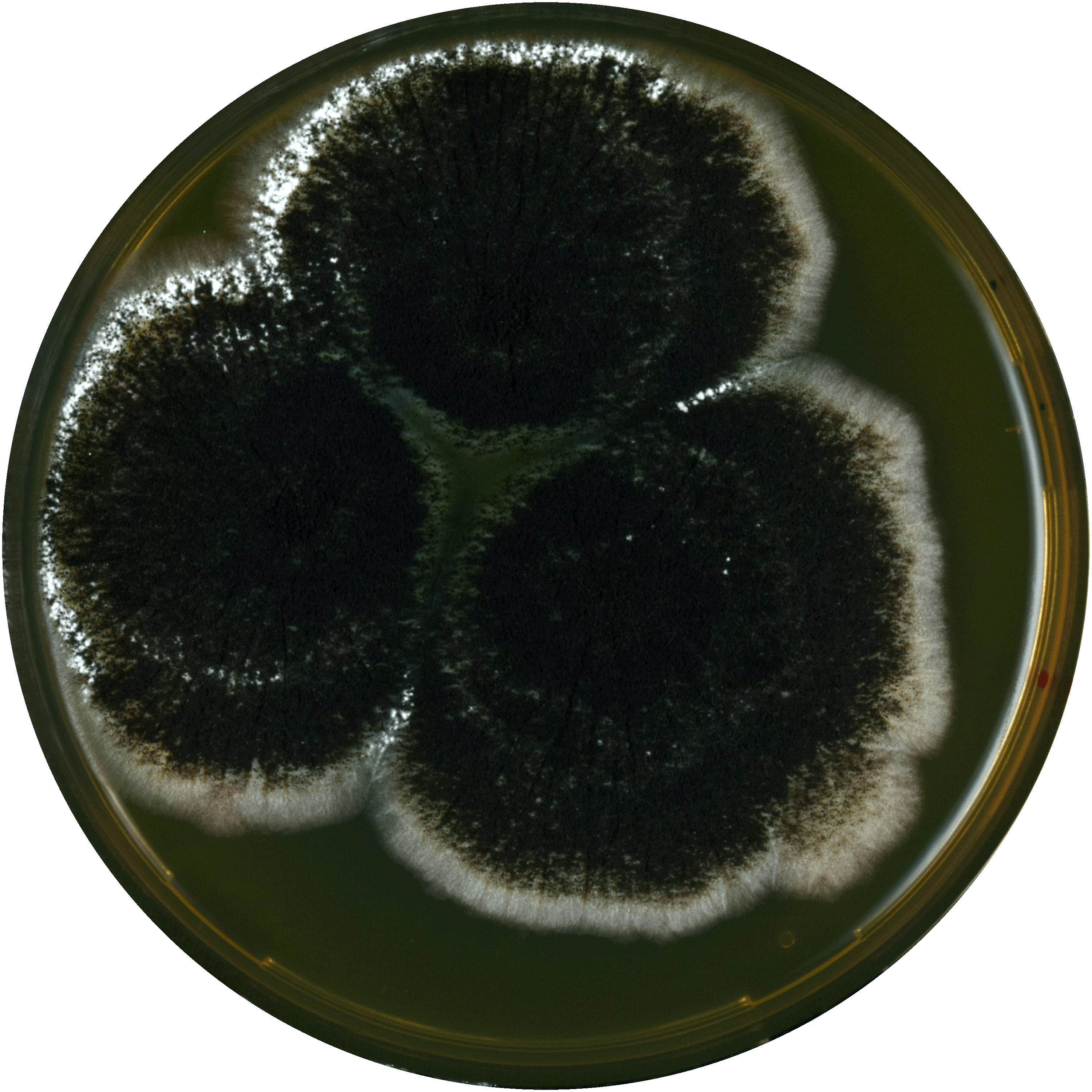
Aspergillus floridensis growing on MEAOX plate
