= Aspergillus hiratsukae =

Scientific classification
- Kingdom: Fungi
- Division: Ascomycota
- Class: Eurotiomycetes
- Order: Eurotiales
- Family: Aspergillaceae
- Genus: Aspergillus
- Species: A. hiratsukae

Binomial name
- Aspergillus hiratsukae Udagawa, Tsubouchi & Y. Horie (1991)

Species of fungus

Aspergillus hiratsukae is a species of fungus in the genus Aspergillus. It is from the Fumigati section. The species was first described in 1991. It has been reported to produce avenaciolide.

== Growth and morphology ==
A. hiratsukae has been cultivated on both Czapek yeast extract agar (CYA) plates and Malt Extract Agar Oxoid® (MEAOX) plates. The growth morphology of the colonies can be seen in the pictures below.

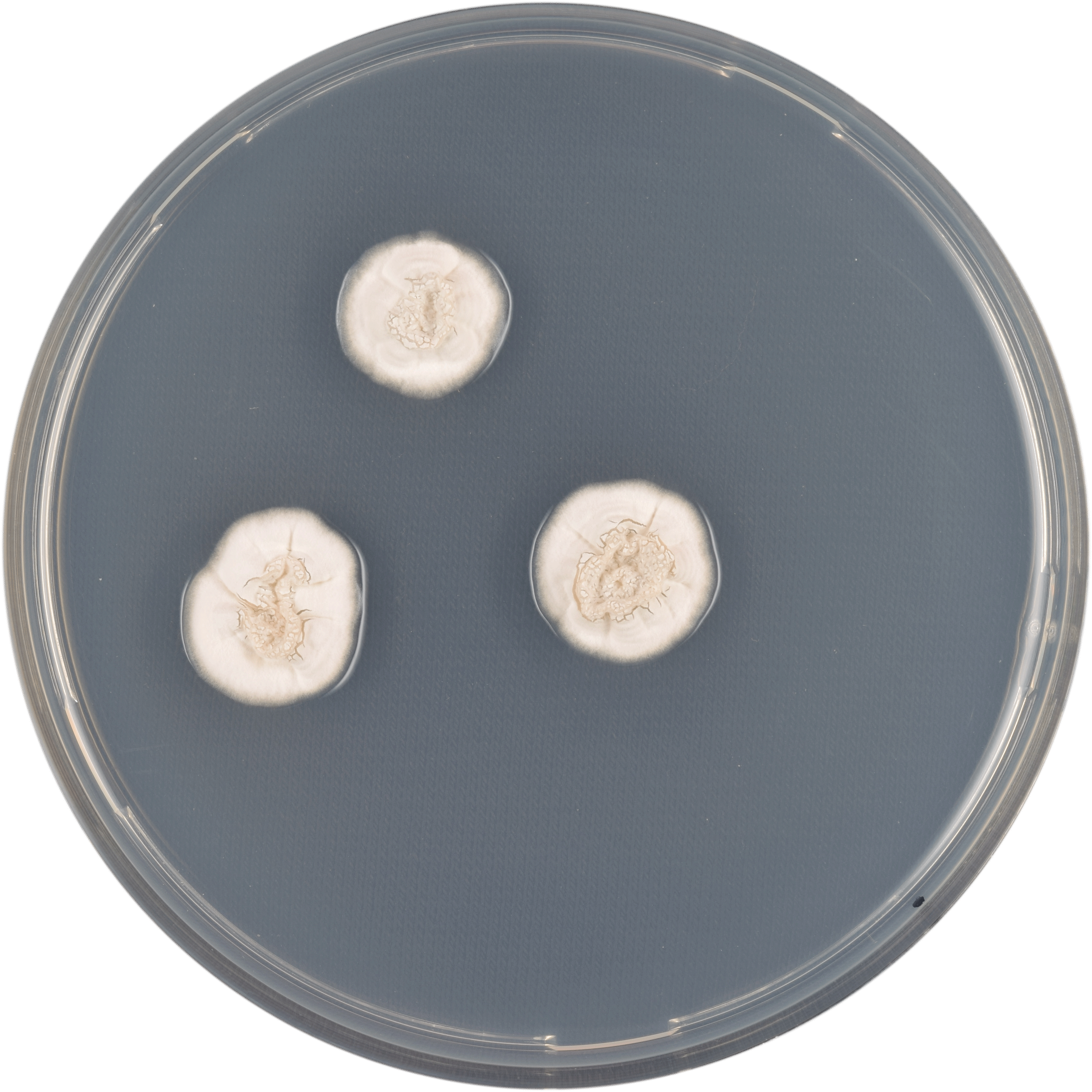
Aspergillus hiratsukae growing on CYA plate

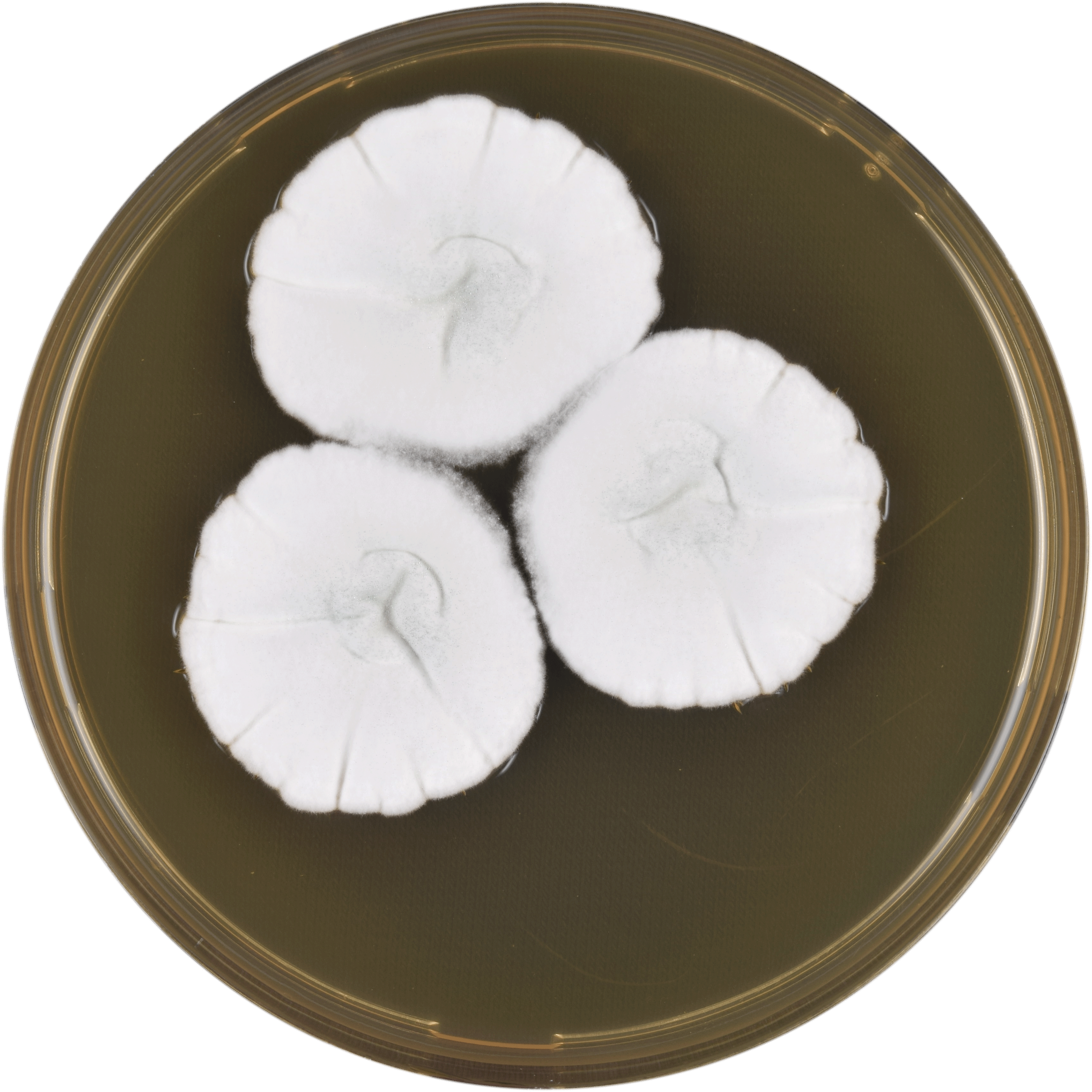
Aspergillus hiratsukae growing on MEAOX plate
