= Aspergillus similis =

Scientific classification
- Kingdom: Fungi
- Division: Ascomycota
- Class: Eurotiomycetes
- Order: Eurotiales
- Family: Aspergillaceae
- Genus: Aspergillus
- Species: A. similis

Binomial name
- Aspergillus similis (Y. Horie, Udagawa, Abdullah & Al-Bader) Samson, Visagie & Houbraken (2014)

Synonyms
- Aspergillus violaceus

Species of fungus

Aspergillus similis is a species of fungus in the genus Aspergillus. It is from the Nidulantes section. The species was first described in 2014.

== Growth and morphology ==
A. similis has been cultivated on both Czapek yeast extract agar (CYA) plates and Malt Extract Agar Oxoid® (MEAOX) plates. The growth morphology of the colonies can be seen in the pictures below.

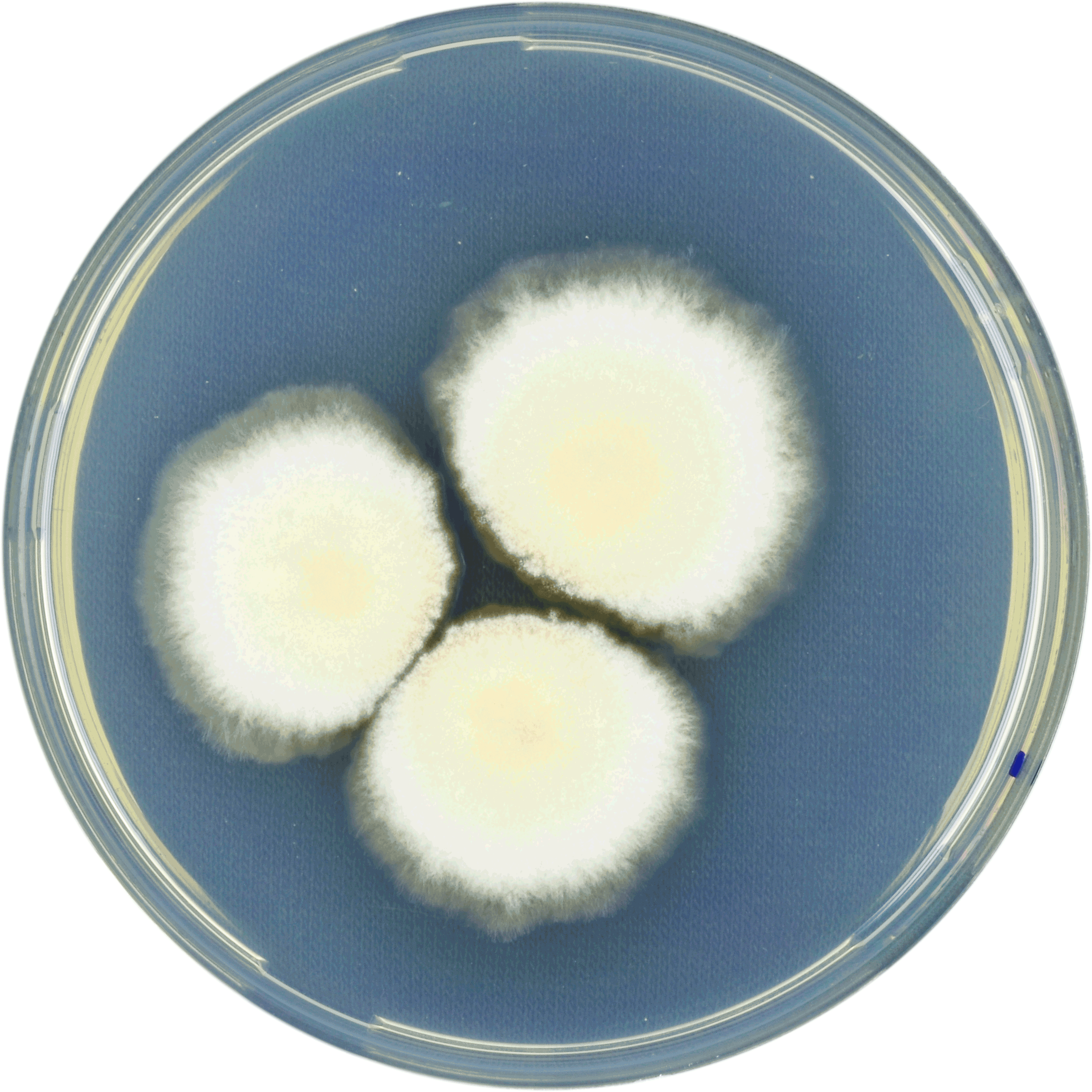
Aspergillus similis growing on CYA plate

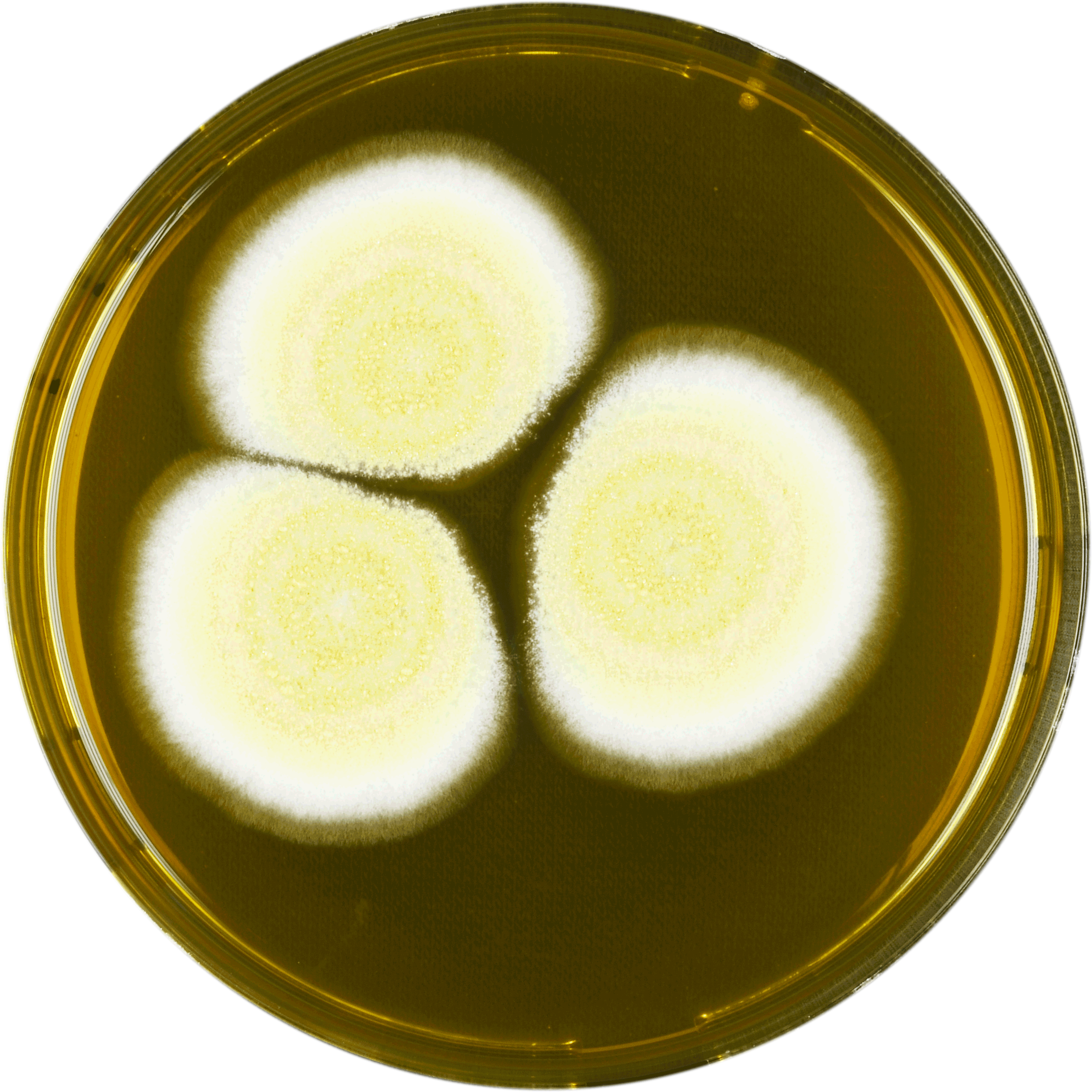
Aspergillus similis growing on MEAOX plate
