= Aspergillus acidohumus =

Scientific classification
- Kingdom: Fungi
- Division: Ascomycota
- Class: Eurotiomycetes
- Order: Eurotiales
- Family: Aspergillaceae
- Genus: Aspergillus
- Species: A. acidohumus

Binomial name
- Aspergillus acidohumus A.J. Chen, Frisvad & Samson (2016)

Species of fungus

Aspergillus acidohumus is a species of fungus in the genus Aspergillus. It is from the Cervini section. The species was first described in 2016. It has not been reported to produce any extrolites.

== Growth on agar plates ==
Apsergillus acidohumus has been cultivated on both Czapek yeast extract agar (CYA) plates and Malt Extract Agar Oxoid® (MEAOX) plates. The growth morphology of the colonies can be seen in the pictures below.

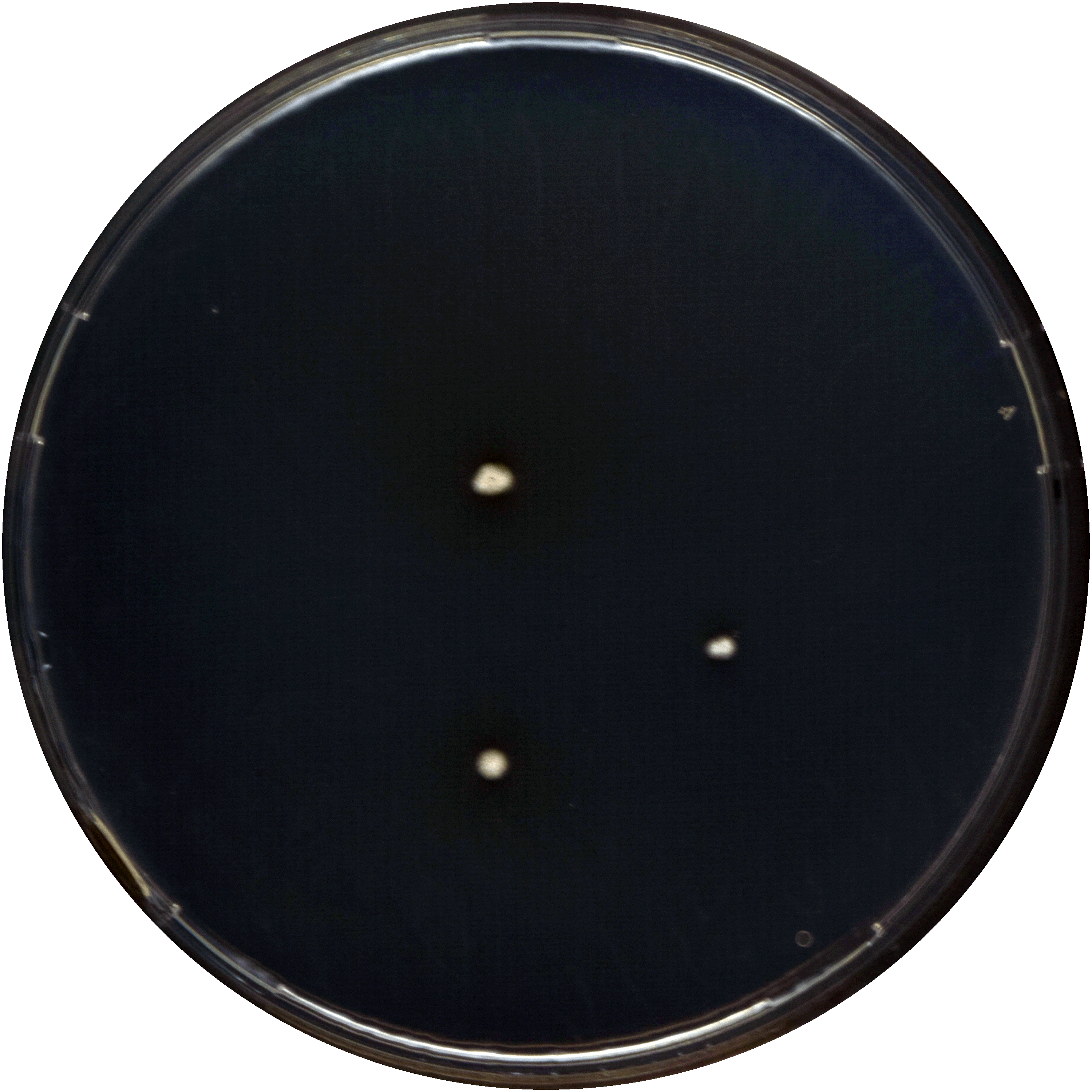
Aspergillus acidohumus growing on CYA media

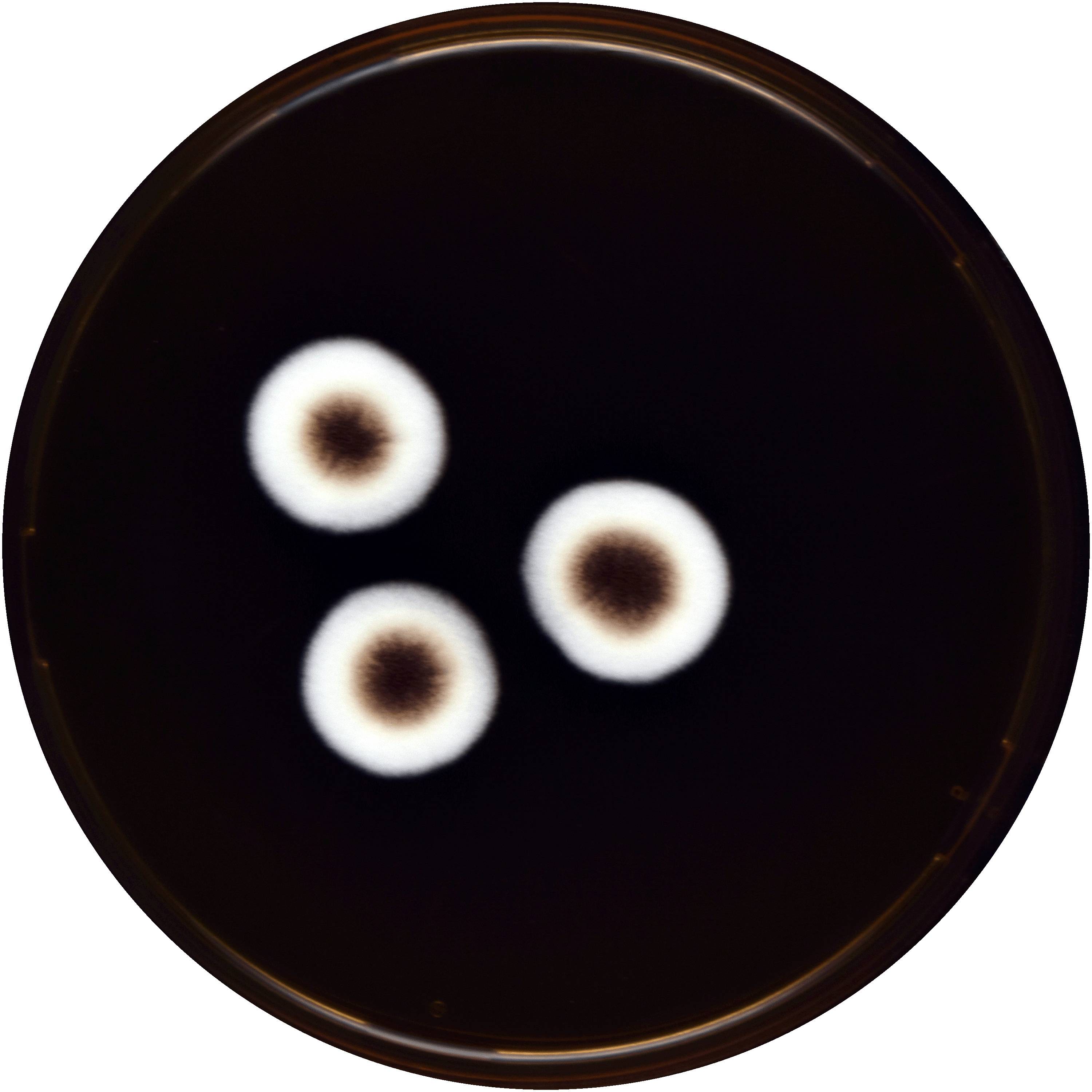
Aspergillus acidohumus growing on MEAOX media
