= Aspergillus subnutans =

Scientific classification
- Kingdom: Fungi
- Division: Ascomycota
- Class: Eurotiomycetes
- Order: Eurotiales
- Family: Aspergillaceae
- Genus: Aspergillus
- Species: A. subnutans

Binomial name
- Aspergillus subnutans A.J. Chen, Frisvad & Samson (2016)

Species of fungus

Aspergillus subnutans is a species of fungus in the genus Aspergillus. It is from the Cervini section. The species was first described in 2016. It has been reported to produce 4-hydroxymellein.

== Growth and morphology ==
A. subnutans has been cultivated on both Czapek yeast extract agar (CYA) plates and Malt Extract Agar Oxoid® (MEAOX) plates. The growth morphology of the colonies can be seen in the pictures below.

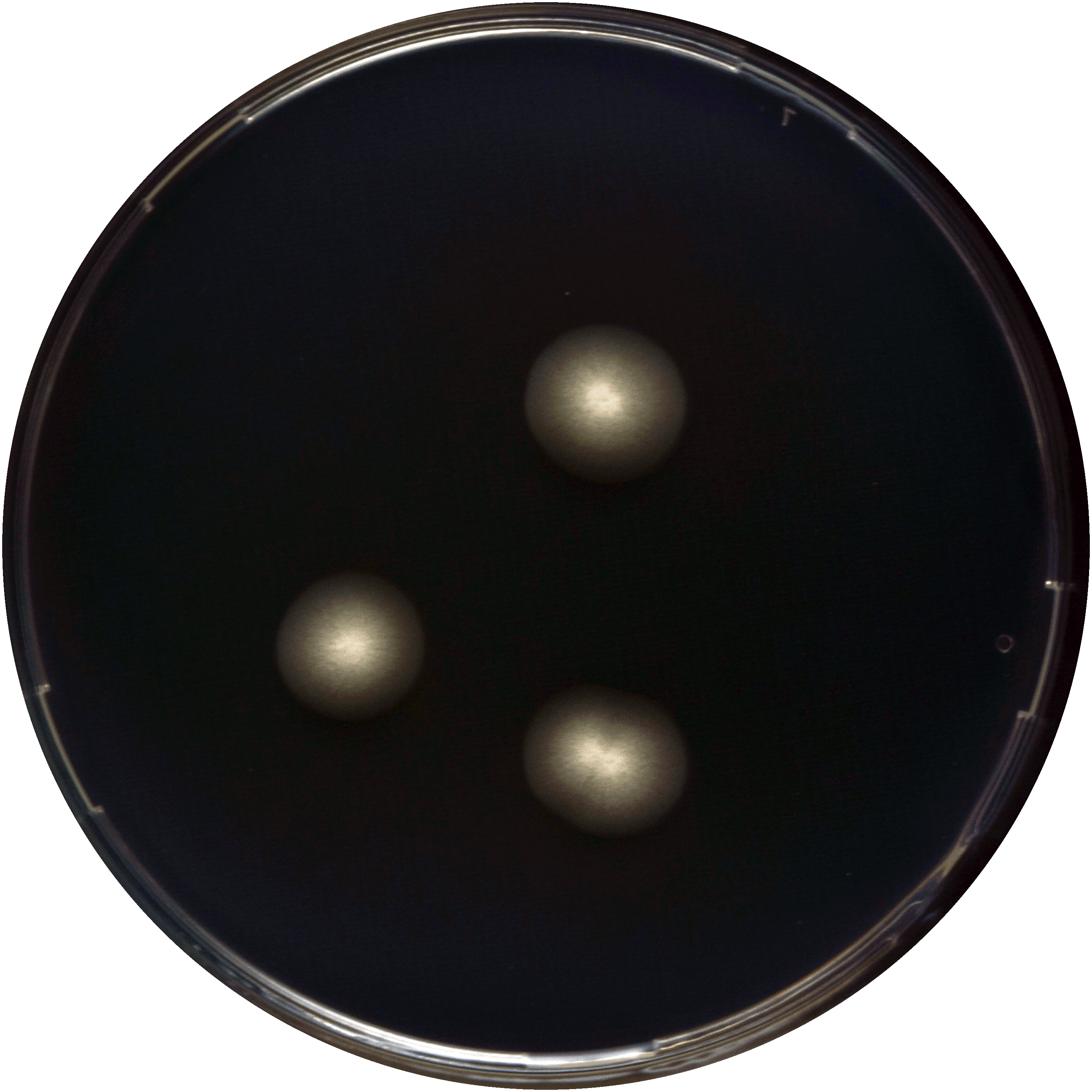
Aspergillus subnutans growing on CYA plate

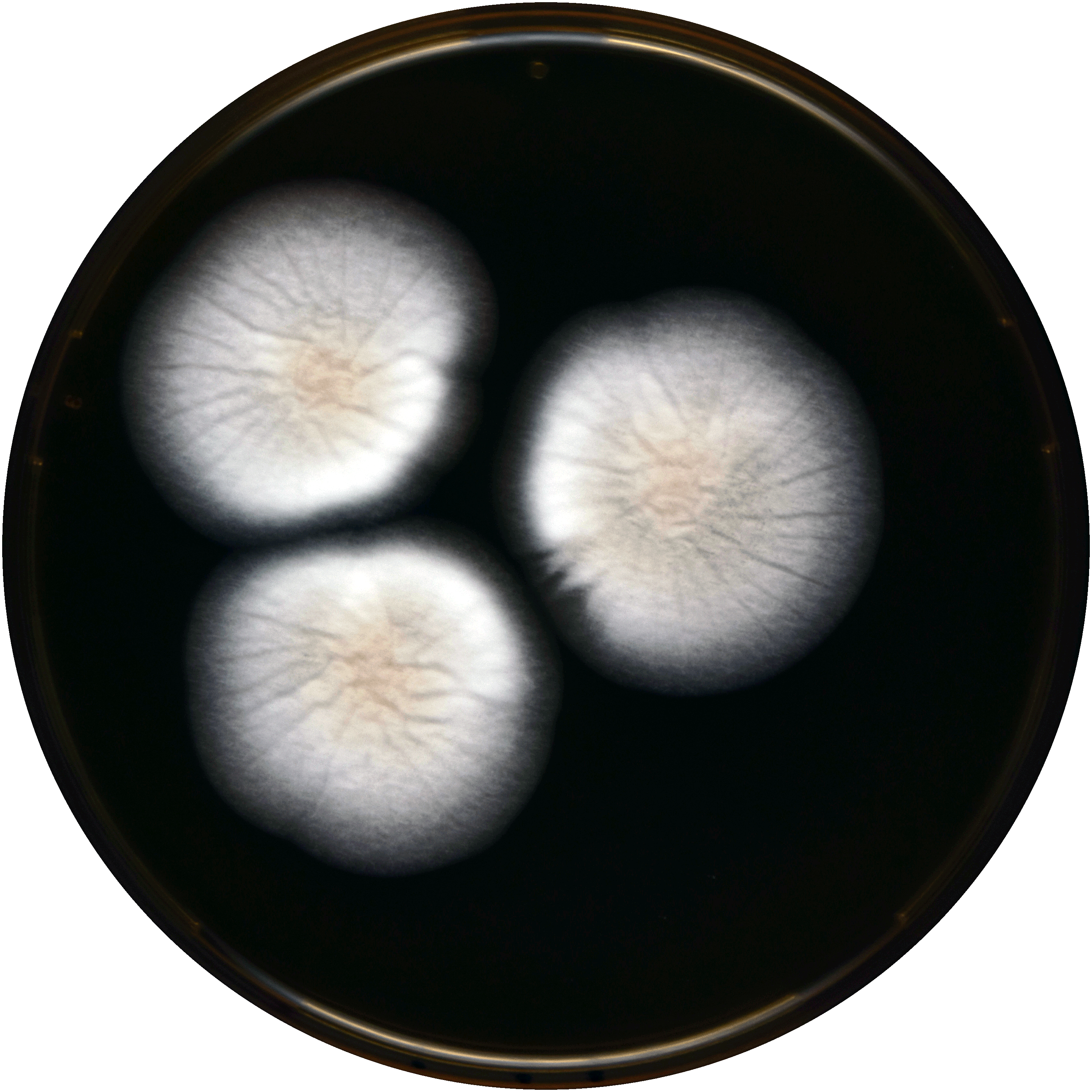
Aspergillus subnutans growing on MEAOX plate
