= Aspergillus arxii =

Scientific classification
- Kingdom: Fungi
- Division: Ascomycota
- Class: Eurotiomycetes
- Order: Eurotiales
- Family: Aspergillaceae
- Genus: Aspergillus
- Species: A. arxii

Binomial name
- Aspergillus arxii Fort & Guarro (1984)

Synonyms
- Cristaspora arxii

Species of fungus

Aspergillus arxii (also referred to as Cristaspora arxii) is a species of fungus in the genus Aspergillus. It is from the Cremei section. The species was first described in 1984.

== Growth and morphology ==
A. arxii has been cultivated on both Czapek yeast extract agar (CYA) plates and Malt Extract Agar Oxoid® (MEAOX) plates. The growth morphology of the colonies can be seen in the pictures below.

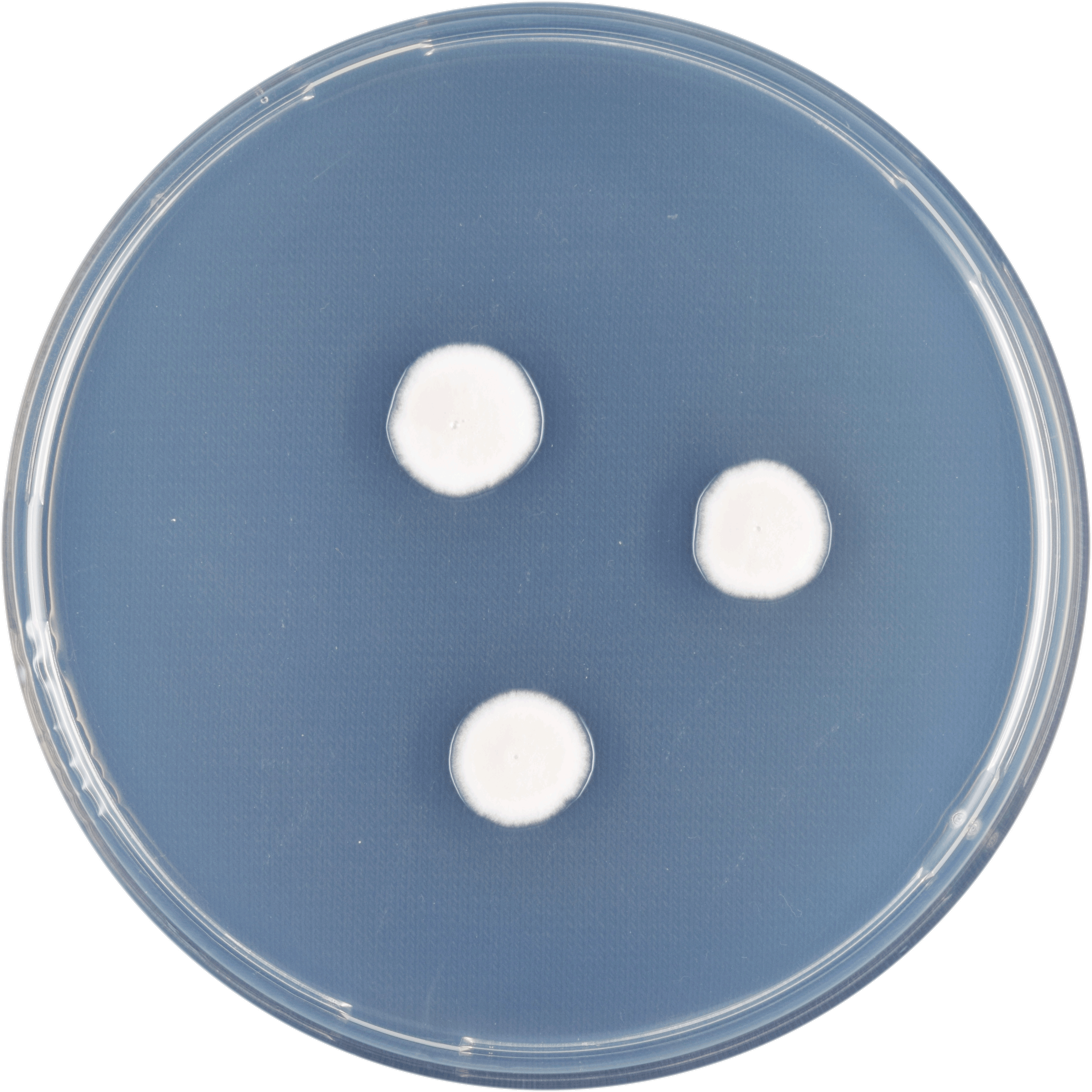
Aspergillus arxii growing on CYA plate

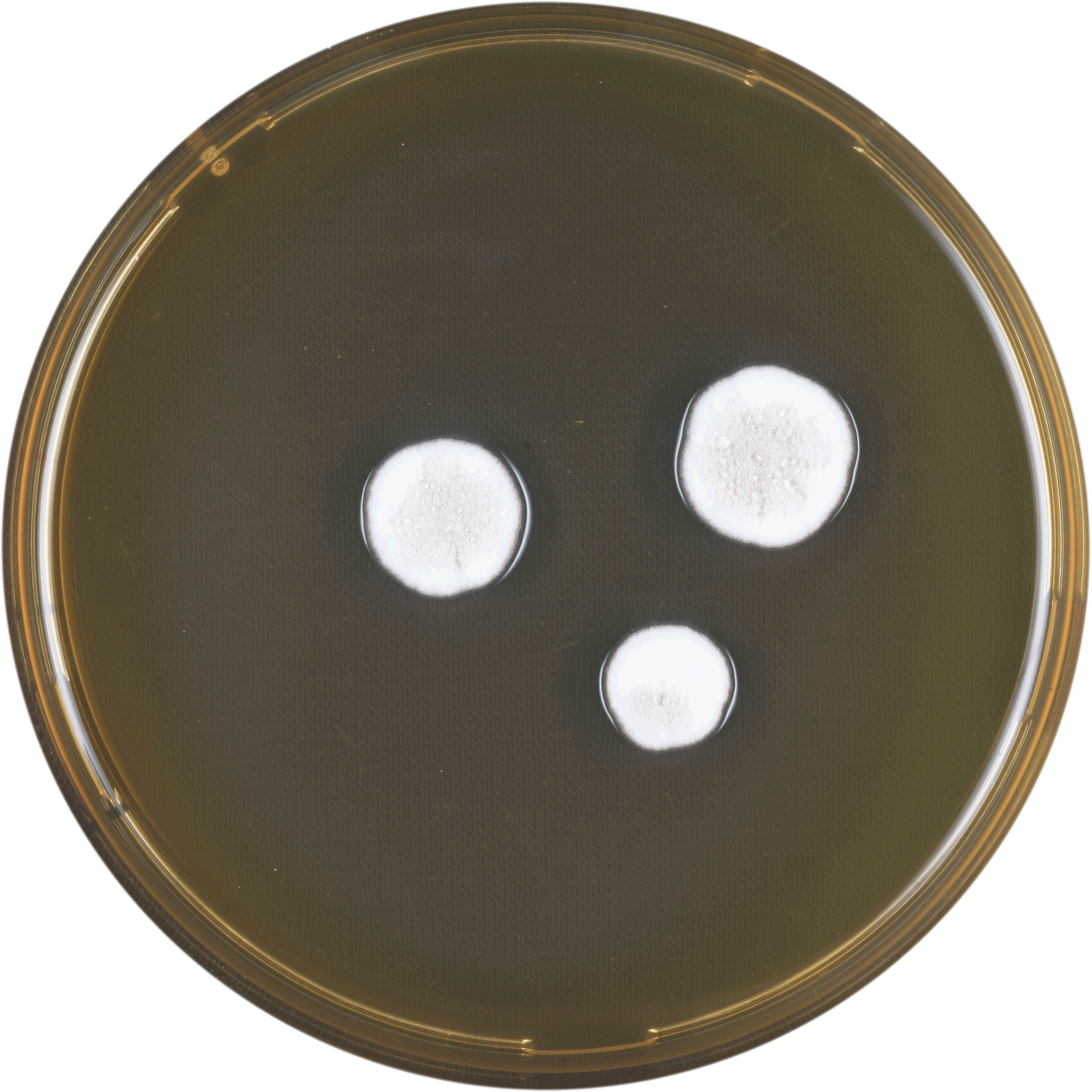
Aspergillus arxii growing on MEAOX plate
