= Aspergillus turcosus =

Scientific classification
- Kingdom: Fungi
- Division: Ascomycota
- Class: Eurotiomycetes
- Order: Eurotiales
- Family: Aspergillaceae
- Genus: Aspergillus
- Species: A. turcosus

Binomial name
- Aspergillus turcosus S.B. Hong, Frisvad & Samson (2008)

Species of fungus

Aspergillus turcosus is a species of fungus in the genus Aspergillus. It is from the Fumigati section. The species was first described in 2008. It has been reported to produce kotanins.

== Growth and morphology ==
A. turcosus has been cultivated on both Czapek yeast extract agar (CYA) plates and Malt Extract Agar Oxoid® (MEAOX) plates. The growth morphology of the colonies can be seen in the pictures below.

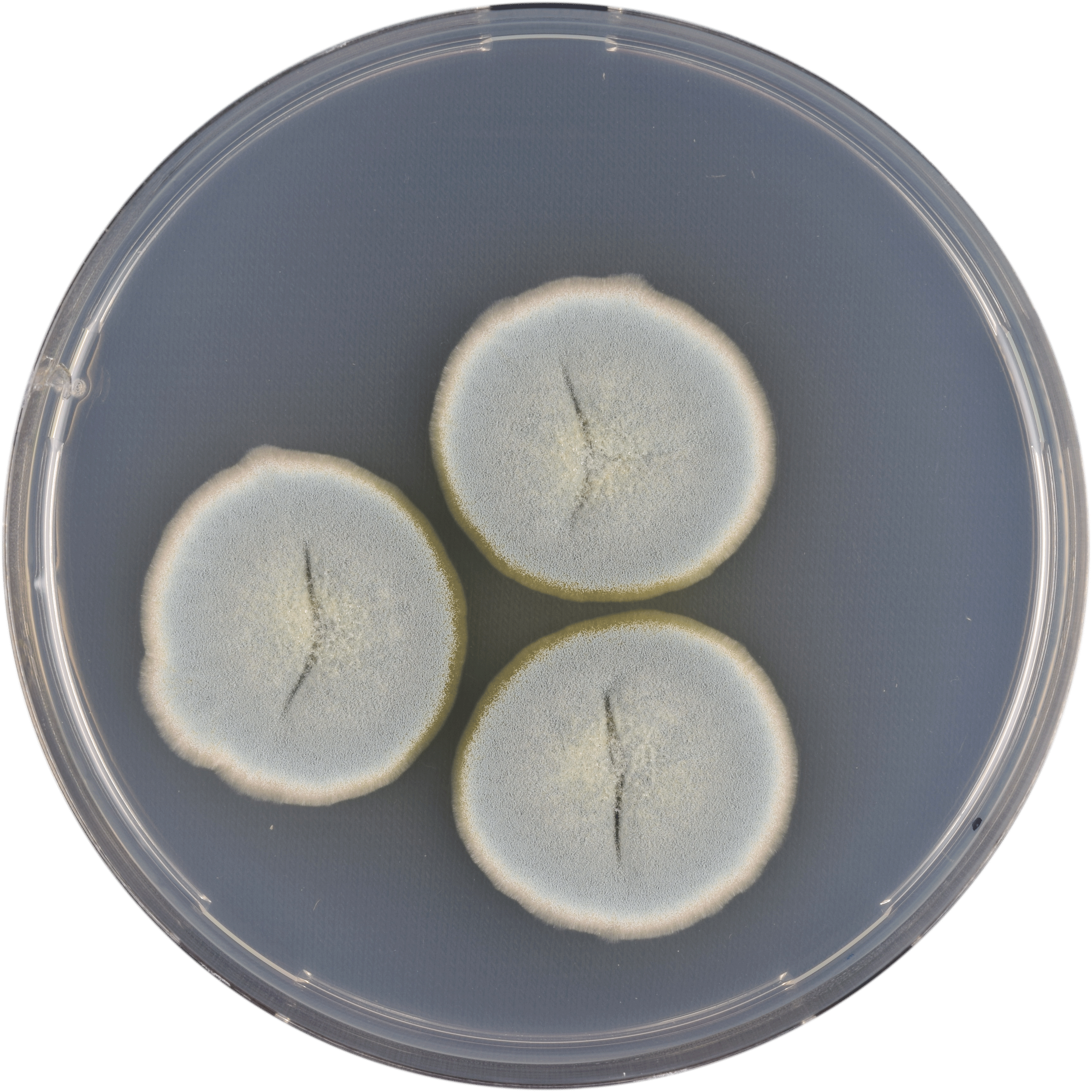
Aspergillus turcosus growing on CYA plate

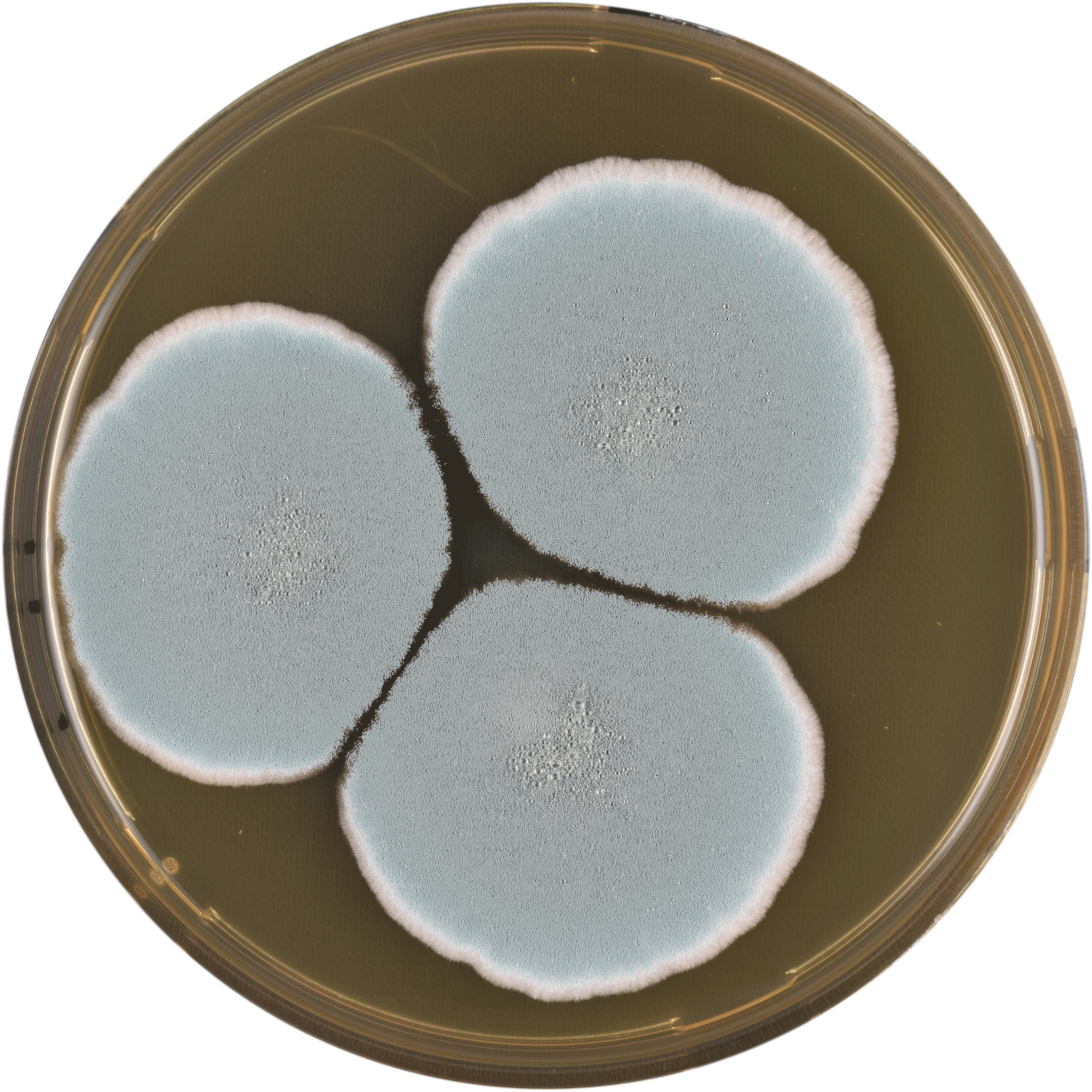
Aspergillus turcosus growing on MEAOX plate
