= Aspergillus nakazawae =

Scientific classification
- Kingdom: Fungi
- Division: Ascomycota
- Class: Eurotiomycetes
- Order: Eurotiales
- Family: Aspergillaceae
- Genus: Aspergillus
- Species: A. nakazawae

Binomial name
- Aspergillus nakazawae Sakaguchi, Iizuka & M. Yamazaki (1950)

Species of fungus

Aspergillus nakazawae is a species of fungus in the genus Aspergillus. The species was first described in 1950.

== Growth and morphology ==
A. nakazawae has been cultivated on both Czapek yeast extract agar (CYA) plates and Malt Extract Agar Oxoid® (MEAOX) plates. The growth morphology of the colonies can be seen in the pictures below.

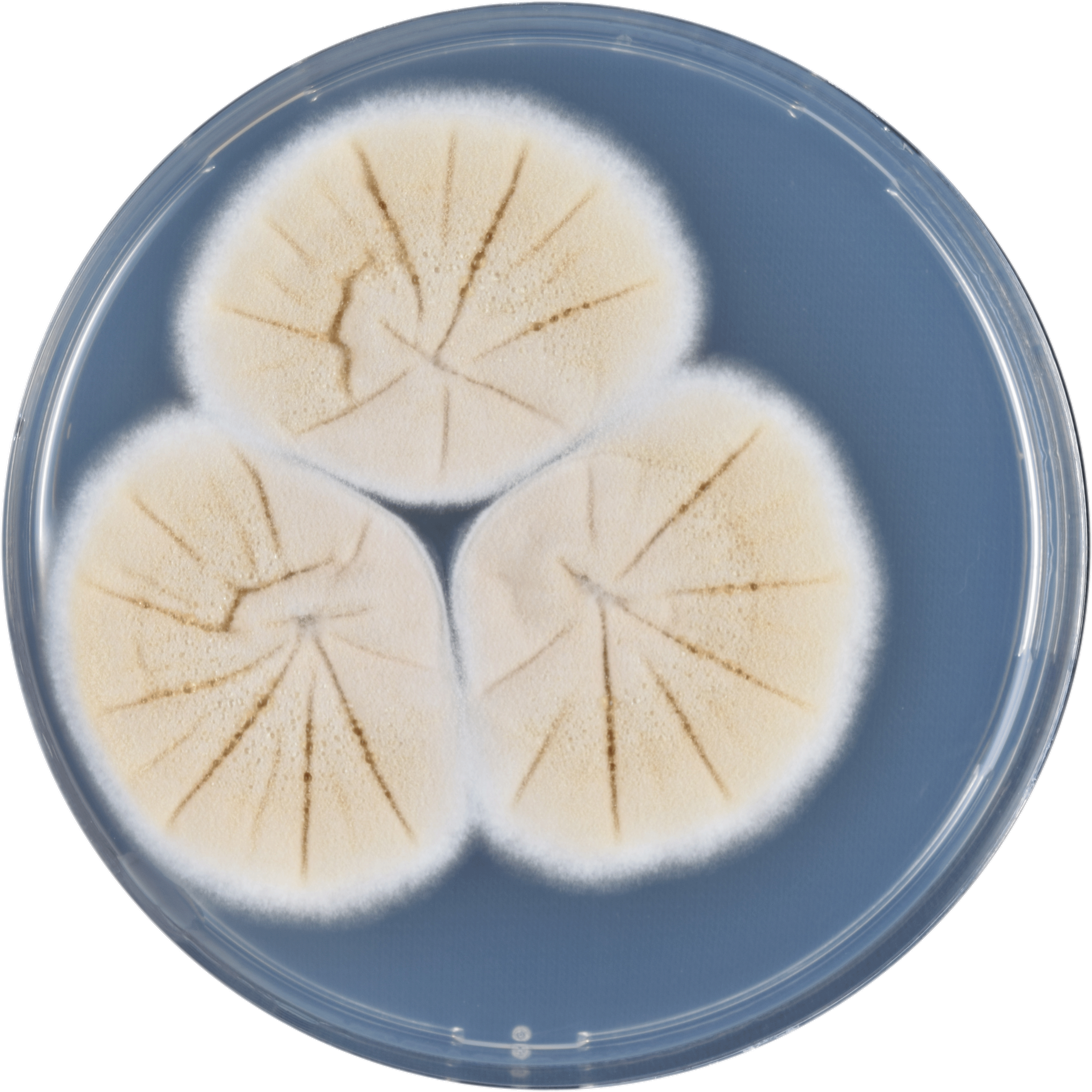
Aspergillus nakazawae growing on CYA plate

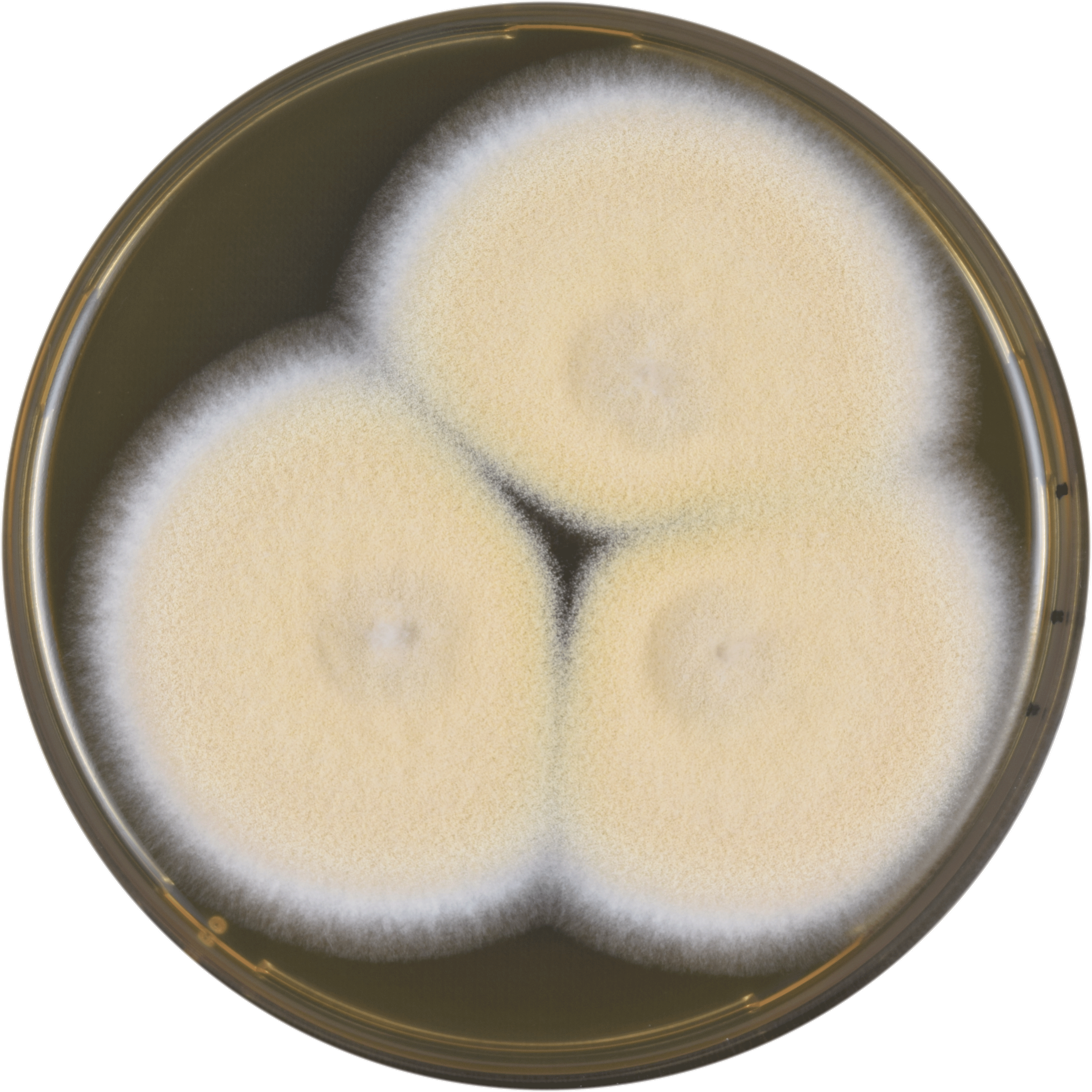
Aspergillus nakazawae growing on MEAOX plate
