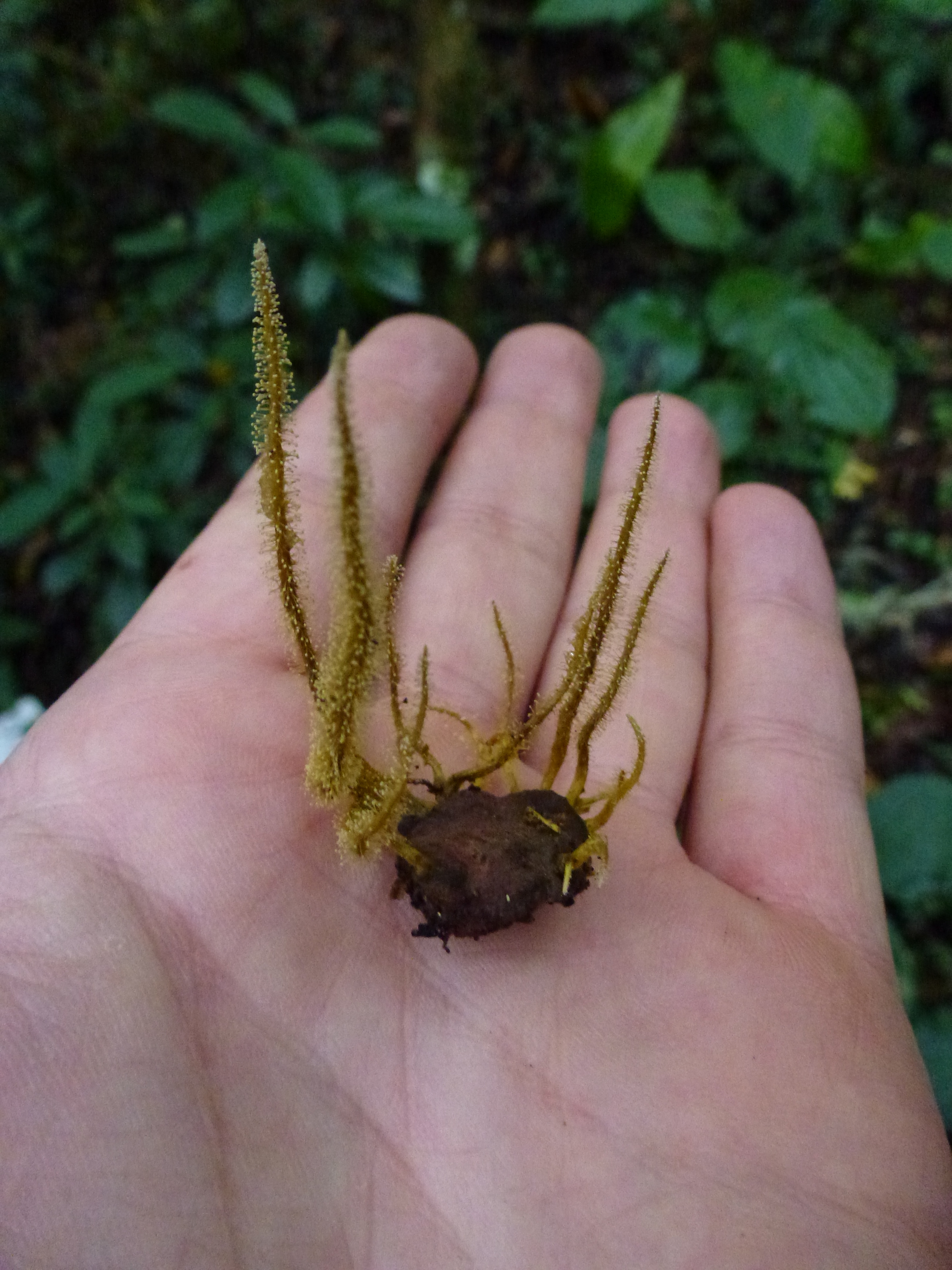

Scientific classification
- Kingdom: Fungi
- Division: Ascomycota
- Class: Eurotiomycetes
- Order: Eurotiales
- Family: Aspergillaceae
- Genus: Aspergillus
- Species: A. dybowskii

Binomial name
- Aspergillus dybowskii (Patouillard) Samson 1985

Synonyms
- Penicilliopsis dybowskii, Stilbothamnium dybowskii

= Aspergillus dybowskii =

Species of fungus

Aspergillus dybowskii is a species of fungus in the genus Aspergillus which occurs in Southeast Asia.
