= Aspergillus pernambucoensis =

Scientific classification
- Kingdom: Fungi
- Division: Ascomycota
- Class: Eurotiomycetes
- Order: Eurotiales
- Family: Aspergillaceae
- Genus: Aspergillus
- Species: A. parafelis

Binomial name
- Aspergillus parafelis Y. Horie, Matsuzawa, Yaguchi & Takaki (2014)

Species of fungus

Aspergillus pernambucoensis is a species of fungus in the genus Aspergillus. It is from the Fumigati section. Several fungi from this section produce heat-resistant ascospores, and the isolates from this section are frequently obtained from locations where natural fires have previously occurred. The species was first described in 2014. It has been isolated from semi-desert soil in caatinga area in Brazil.
