= Aspergillus levisporus =

Scientific classification
- Kingdom: Fungi
- Division: Ascomycota
- Class: Eurotiomycetes
- Order: Eurotiales
- Family: Aspergillaceae
- Genus: Aspergillus
- Species: A. levisporus

Binomial name
- Aspergillus levisporus A.J. Chen, Jurjevic & Samson (2017)

Species of fungus

Aspergillus levisporus is a species of fungus in the genus Aspergillus. It is from the Aspergillus section. The species was first described in 2017. It has been isolated from a bedroom in the United States. It has been reported to produce auroglaucin, dihydroauroglaucin, echinulins, flavoglaucin, isoechinulins, neoechinulins, and tetrahydroauroglaucin.
