= Aspergillus costiformis =

Scientific classification
- Kingdom: Fungi
- Division: Ascomycota
- Class: Eurotiomycetes
- Order: Eurotiales
- Family: Aspergillaceae
- Genus: Aspergillus
- Species: A. costiformis

Binomial name
- Aspergillus costiformis H.Z. Kong & Z.T. Qi (1995)

Species of fungus

Aspergillus costiformis is a species of fungus in the genus Aspergillus. It is from the Aspergillus section. The species was first described in 1995. A. costiformis has been reported to produce auroglaucin, dihydroauroglaucin, echinulins, epiheveadrides, flavoglaucin, isoechinulins, neoechinulins, physcion, and tetrahydroauroglaucin.
