= Aspergillus brevistipitatus =

Scientific classification
- Kingdom: Fungi
- Division: Ascomycota
- Class: Eurotiomycetes
- Order: Eurotiales
- Family: Aspergillaceae
- Genus: Aspergillus
- Species: A. brevistipitatus

Binomial name
- Aspergillus brevistipitatus A. Nováková & Hubka 2014

Type strain
- CCF 4149, VH-2013a, CBS 135454, CCF 4149, CMF ISB 2152, IFM 60858, NRRL 62500, PRM 860543, PRM 860544

Species of fungus

Aspergillus brevistipitatus is a species of fungus in the genus Aspergillus. It is from the Fumigati section. It was first described in 2013.
