= Aspergillus dorothicus =

Scientific classification
- Kingdom: Fungi
- Division: Ascomycota
- Class: Eurotiomycetes
- Order: Eurotiales
- Family: Aspergillaceae
- Genus: Aspergillus
- Species: A. dorothicus

Binomial name
- Aspergillus dorothicus Varshney & A.K. Sarbhoy (1996)

Species of fungus

Aspergillus dorothicus is a species of fungus in the genus Aspergillus which has been isolated from soil from Tamil Nadu in India. Described by Varshney & A.K. Sarbhoy 1996, this species listed in Catalogue of Life: 2011 Annual Checklist.
