= Aspergillus transcarpathicus =

Scientific classification
- Kingdom: Fungi
- Division: Ascomycota
- Class: Eurotiomycetes
- Order: Eurotiales
- Family: Aspergillaceae
- Genus: Aspergillus
- Species: A. transcarpathicus

Binomial name
- Aspergillus transcarpathicus A.J. Chen, Frisvad & Samson (2016)

Species of fungus

Aspergillus transcarpathicus is a species of fungus in the genus Aspergillus. It is from the Cervini section. The species was first described in 2016. It has been reported to produce asparvenones, terremutin, 4-hydroxymellein, and xanthocillin.
