= Aspergillus domesticus =

Scientific classification
- Kingdom: Fungi
- Division: Ascomycota
- Class: Eurotiomycetes
- Order: Eurotiales
- Family: Aspergillaceae
- Genus: Aspergillus
- Species: A. domesticus

Binomial name
- Aspergillus domesticus F. Sklenar, Houbraken, Zalar & Hubka (2017)

Species of fungus

Aspergillus domesticus is a species of fungus in the genus Aspergillus. It is from the Robusti section. The species was first described in 2017. It has been isolated from wallpaper and a museum piece in the Netherlands. It has been reported to produce asperphenamate.
