= Aspergillus helicothrix =

Scientific classification
- Kingdom: Fungi
- Division: Ascomycota
- Class: Eurotiomycetes
- Order: Eurotiales
- Family: Aspergillaceae
- Genus: Aspergillus
- Species: A. helicothrix

Binomial name
- Aspergillus helicothrix Al-Musallam, Antonie van Leeuwenhoek(1980)

Type strain
- BCRC 32730, CBS 677.79, CCRC 32730, CECT 20390, IMI 278383, JCM 1861, PIL 600

Species of fungus

Aspergillus helicothrix is a species of fungus in the genus Aspergillus.
