= Aspergillus leucocarpus =

Scientific classification
- Kingdom: Fungi
- Division: Ascomycota
- Class: Eurotiomycetes
- Order: Eurotiales
- Family: Aspergillaceae
- Genus: Aspergillus
- Species: A. leucocarpus

Binomial name
- Aspergillus leucocarpus Hadlok & Stolk (1969)

Species of fungus

Aspergillus leucocarpus is a species of fungus in the genus Aspergillus. It is from the Aspergillus section. The species was first described in 1969. It has been reported to produce an apolar indoloterpene, echinulins, epiheveadrides, and neoechinulins.
