= Aspergillus baarnensis =

Scientific classification
- Domain: Eukaryota
- Kingdom: Fungi
- Division: Ascomycota
- Class: Eurotiomycetes
- Order: Eurotiales
- Family: Aspergillaceae
- Genus: Aspergillus
- Species: A. baarnensis

Binomial name
- Aspergillus baarnensis Samson, Visagie & Houbraken 2014

Synonyms
- Oospora halophila, Basipetospora halophila, Phialosimplex halophila, Phialosimplex halophilus

Species of fungus

Aspergillus baarnensis is a species of fungus in the genus Aspergillus.
