= Aspergillus novoguineensis =

Scientific classification
- Kingdom: Fungi
- Division: Ascomycota
- Class: Eurotiomycetes
- Order: Eurotiales
- Family: Aspergillaceae
- Genus: Aspergillus
- Species: A. novoguineensis

Binomial name
- Aspergillus novoguineensis A.J. Chen, Frisvad & Samson (2016)

Species of fungus

Aspergillus novoguineensis is a species of fungus in the genus Aspergillus. It is from the Cervini section. The species was first described in 2016. It has been reported to produce an asparvenone, sclerotigenin, and terremutin.
