= Aspergillus mangaliensis =

Scientific classification
- Kingdom: Fungi
- Division: Ascomycota
- Class: Eurotiomycetes
- Order: Eurotiales
- Family: Aspergillaceae
- Genus: Aspergillus
- Species: A. mangaliensis

Binomial name
- Aspergillus mangaliensis A. Nováková, Hubka, M. Kolařík, S.W. Peterson (2015)

Species of fungus

Aspergillus mangaliensis is a species of fungus in the genus Aspergillus. It is from the Flavipedes section. The species was first described in 2015.
