= Aspergillus flaschentraegeri =

Scientific classification
- Kingdom: Fungi
- Division: Ascomycota
- Class: Eurotiomycetes
- Order: Eurotiales
- Family: Aspergillaceae
- Genus: Aspergillus
- Species: A. flaschentraegeri

Binomial name
- Aspergillus flaschentraegeri Stolk (1964)

Species of fungus

Aspergillus flaschentraegeri is a species of fungus in the genus Aspergillus. It is from the Cremei section. The species was first described in 1964.
