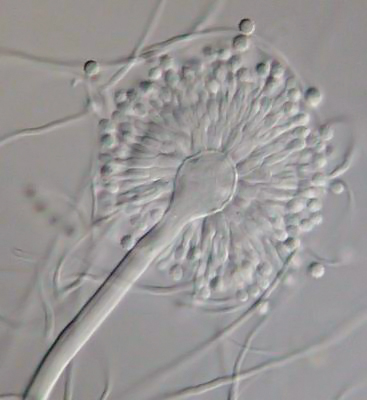
- Aspergillus versicolor

Scientific classification
- Kingdom: Fungi
- Division: Ascomycota
- Class: Eurotiomycetes
- Order: Eurotiales
- Family: Aspergillaceae
- Genus: Aspergillus
- Subgenus: Nidulantes; Gams et al. (1986)

Type species
- Aspergillus nidulans

= Aspergillus subg. Nidulantes =

Subgenus of fungi

Nidulantes is a subgenus of Aspergillus in the family Trichocomaceae.

== Taxonomy ==
The subgenus Nidulantes contained 124 species in 2020. Their teleomorphs used to be named in a separate genus, Emericella.

- sect. Aenei
  - ser. Aenei
    - Aspergillus aeneus
    - Aspergillus bicolor
    - Aspergillus coloradensis
    - Aspergillus crustosus
    - Aspergillus discophorus
    - Aspergillus eburneocremeus
    - Aspergillus foeniculicola
    - Aspergillus heyangensis
    - Aspergillus karnatakaensis
    - Aspergillus spectabilis
- sect. Bispori
  - ser. Bispori
    - Aspergillus bisporus
- sect. Cavernicolum
  - ser. Cavernicolum
    - Aspergillus californicus
    - Aspergillus cavernicola
    - Aspergillus kassunensis
    - Aspergillus subsessilis
  - ser. Egyptiaci
    - Aspergillus egyptiacus
- sect. Nidulantes
  - ser. Aurantiobrunnei
    - Aspergillus aurantiobrunneus
    - Aspergillus purpureus
  - ser. Multicolores
    - Aspergillus incahuasiensis
    - Aspergillus multicolor
    - Aspergillus mulundensis
    - Aspergillus pluriseminatus
    - Aspergillus purpureocrustaceus
    - Aspergillus tumidus
  - ser. Nidulantes
    - Aspergillus amethystinus
    - Aspergillus aurantiopurpureus
    - Aspergillus botswanensis
    - Aspergillus corrugatus
    - Aspergillus desertorum
    - Aspergillus dipodomyus
    - Aspergillus falconensis
    - Aspergillus foveolatus
    - Aspergillus fruticulosus
    - Aspergillus jaipurensis
    - Aspergillus latilabiatus
    - Aspergillus navahoensis
    - Aspergillus nidulans
    - Aspergillus omanensis
    - Aspergillus pachycristatus
    - Aspergillus quadrilineatus
    - Aspergillus recurvatus
    - Aspergillus rugulosus
    - Aspergillus savannensis
    - Aspergillus sulphureoviridis
    - Aspergillus violaceus
  - ser. Speluncei
    - Aspergillus askiburgiensis
    - Aspergillus asperescens
    - Aspergillus aureolatus
    - Aspergillus spelunceus
    - Aspergillus varians
    - Aspergillus viridicatenatus
  - ser. Stellati
    - Aspergillus angustatus
    - Aspergillus astellatus
    - Aspergillus caespitosus
    - Aspergillus dromiae
    - Aspergillus filifer
    - Aspergillus miraensis
    - Aspergillus olivicola
    - Aspergillus qinqixianii
    - Aspergillus stella-maris
    - Aspergillus stellatus
    - Aspergillus stelliformis
    - Aspergillus undulatus
    - Aspergillus venezuelensis
  - ser. Ungulum
    - Aspergillus croceiaffinis
    - Aspergillus croceus
    - Aspergillus israelensis
    - Aspergillus longistipitatus
    - Aspergillus unguis
  - ser. Versicolores
    - Aspergillus amoenus
    - Aspergillus austroafricanus
    - Aspergillus creber
    - Aspergillus cvjetkovicii
    - Aspergillus fructus
    - Aspergillus griseoaurantiacus
    - Aspergillus hongkongensis
    - Aspergillus jensenii
    - Aspergillus pepii
    - Aspergillus protuberus
    - Aspergillus puulaauensis
    - Aspergillus subversicolor
    - Aspergillus sydowii
    - Aspergillus tabacinus
    - Aspergillus tennesseensis
    - Aspergillus venenatus
    - Aspergillus versicolor
- sect. Ochraceorosei
  - ser. Funiculosi
    - Aspergillus funiculosus
  - ser. Ochraceorosei
    - Aspergillus chraceoroseus
    - Aspergillus rambellii
- sect. Raperorum
  - ser. Raperorum
    - Aspergillus ivoriensis
    - Aspergillus raperi
- sect. Silvatici
  - ser. Silvatici
    - Aspergillus silvaticus
- sect. Sparsi
  - ser. Biplani
    - Aspergillus biplanus
    - Aspergillus diversus
  - ser. Conjuncti
    - Aspergillus amazonicus
    - Aspergillus anthodesmis
    - Aspergillus conjunctus
    - Aspergillus panamensis
  - ser. Implicati
    - Aspergillus implicatus
  - ser. Sparsi
    - Aspergillus haitiensis
    - Aspergillus sparsus
- sect. Usti
  - ser. Calidousti
    - Aspergillus asper
    - Aspergillus calidoustus
    - Aspergillus carlsbadensis
    - Aspergillus contaminans
    - Aspergillus fuscicans
    - Aspergillus germanicus
    - Aspergillus insuetus
    - Aspergillus keveii
    - Aspergillus keveioides
    - Aspergillus pseudodeflectus
    - Aspergillus sigurros
    - Aspergillus thesauricus
  - ser. Deflecti
    - Aspergillus collinsii
    - Aspergillus deflectus
    - Aspergillus elongatus
    - Aspergillus lucknowensis
    - Aspergillus turkensis
  - ser. Monodiorum
    - Aspergillus monodii
  - ser. Usti
    - Aspergillus baeticus
    - Aspergillus granulosus
    - Aspergillus heterothallicus
    - Aspergillus porphyreostipitatus
    - Aspergillus pseudoustus
    - Aspergillus puniceus
    - Aspergillus ustus
