= Aspergillus aeneus =

Scientific classification
- Kingdom: Fungi
- Division: Ascomycota
- Class: Eurotiomycetes
- Order: Eurotiales
- Family: Aspergillaceae
- Genus: Aspergillus
- Subgenus: Aspergillus subg. Nidulantes
- Species: A. aeneus

Binomial name
- Aspergillus aeneus Sappa (1954)

Species of fungus

Aspergillus aeneus is a species of fungus in the genus Aspergillus in the Aenei section of the subgenus Nidulantes
