= Aspergillus thesauricus =

Scientific classification
- Kingdom: Fungi
- Division: Ascomycota
- Class: Eurotiomycetes
- Order: Eurotiales
- Family: Aspergillaceae
- Genus: Aspergillus
- Species: A. thesauricus

Binomial name
- Aspergillus thesauricus Hubka & A. Novakova (2012)

Species of fungus

Aspergillus thesauricus is a species of fungus in the genus Aspergillus. It is from the Usti section. The species was first described in 2012.

== Growth and morphology ==
A. thesauricus has been cultivated on both Czapek yeast extract agar (CYA) plates and Malt Extract Agar Oxoid® (MEAOX) plates. The growth morphology of the colonies can be seen in the pictures below.

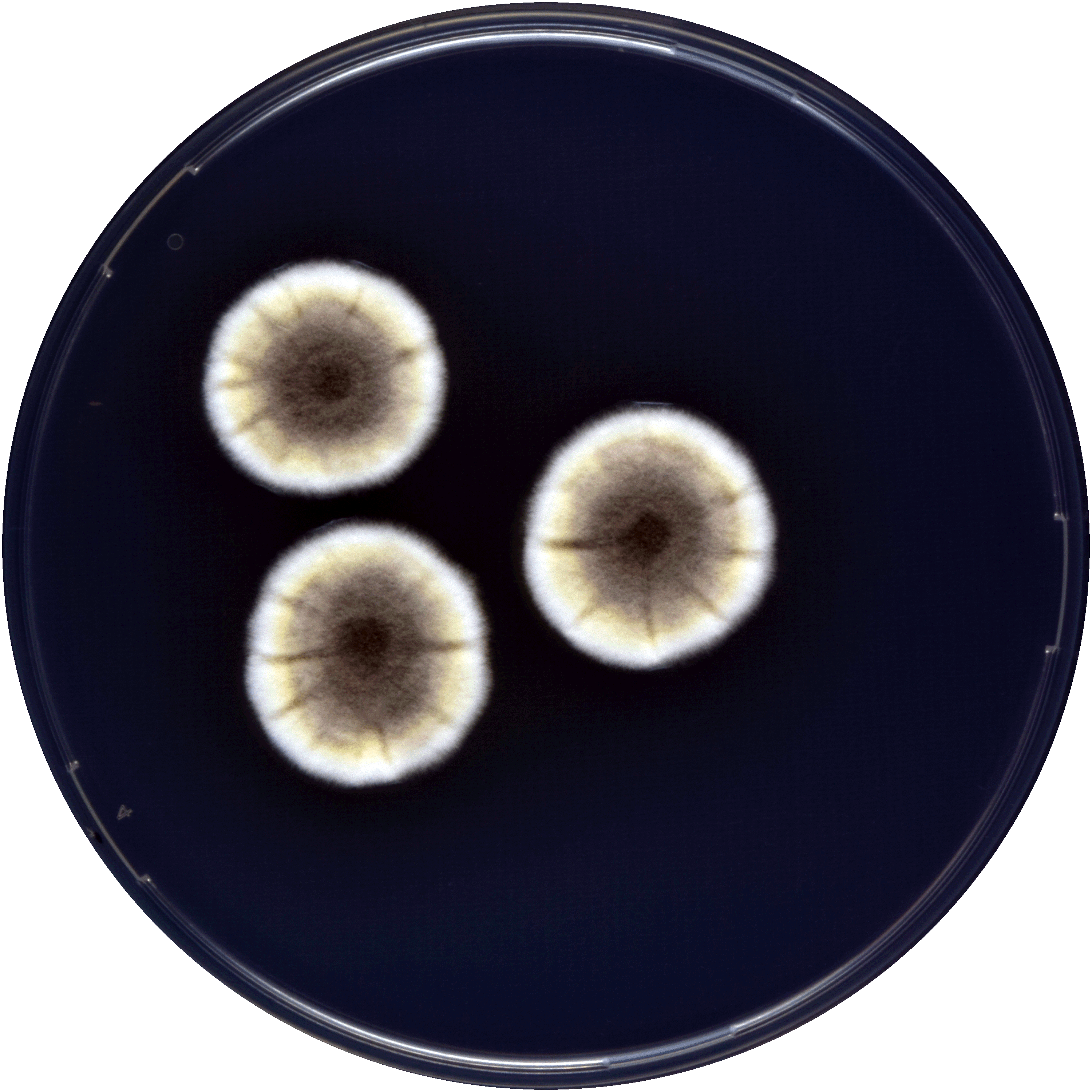
Aspergillus thesauricus growing on CYA plate

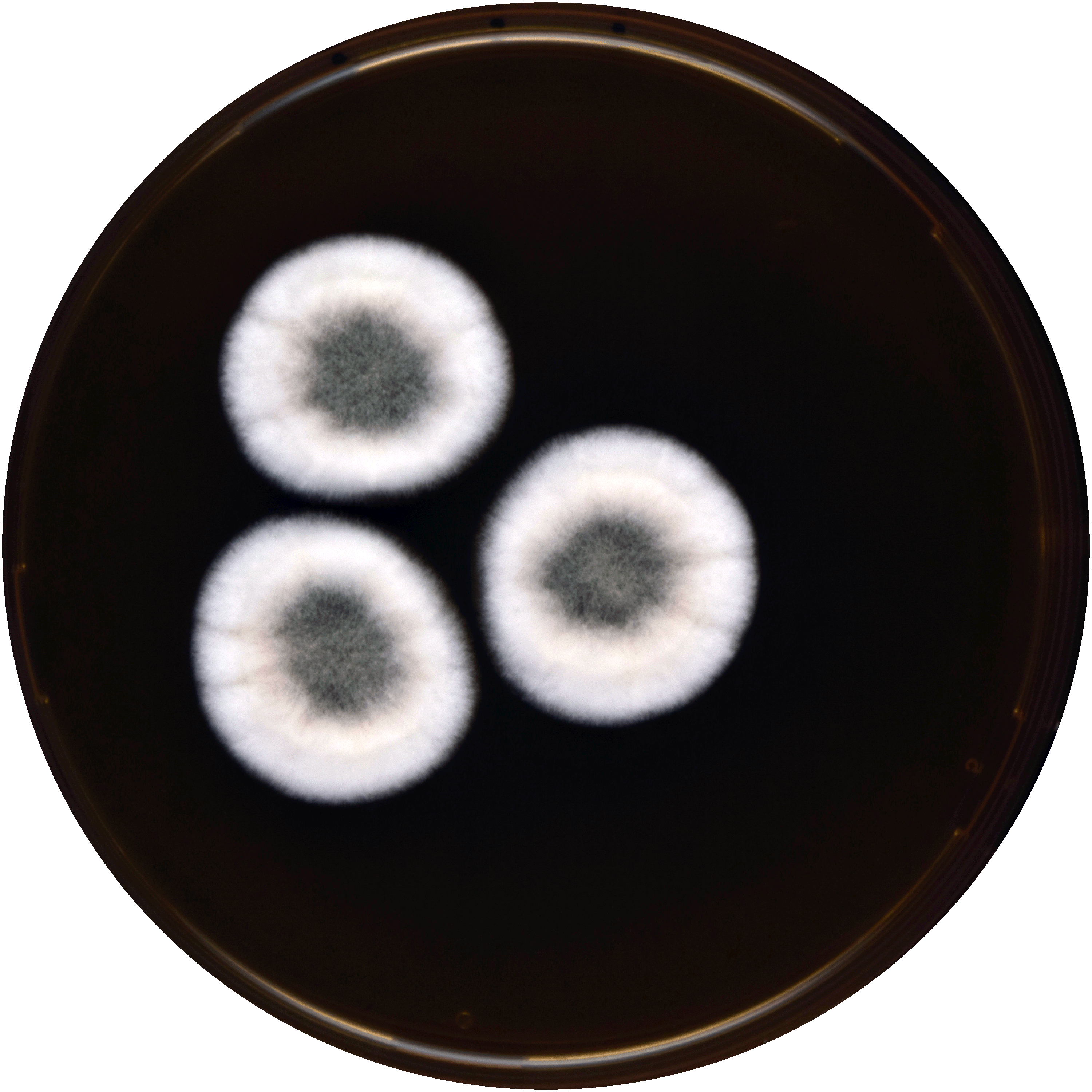
Aspergillus thesauricus growing on MEAOX plate
