= Aspergillus falconensis =

Scientific classification
- Kingdom: Fungi
- Division: Ascomycota
- Class: Eurotiomycetes
- Order: Eurotiales
- Family: Aspergillaceae
- Genus: Aspergillus
- Species: A. falconensis

Binomial name
- Aspergillus falconensis Y. Horie, Miyaji, Nishimura & Udagawa (1989)

Species of fungus

Aspergillus falconensis is a species of fungus in the genus Aspergillus. It is from the Nidulantes section. The species was first described in 1989. It has been reported to produce 3,30-Dihydroxy-5,50-dimethyldiphenyl ether, falconensin A-N, falconenson A-B, hopane-6α,7β,22-triol, hopane-7β,22-diol, mitorubrin, monomethyldihydromitorubrin, monomethylmitorubrin, and zeorin.

== Growth and morphology ==
A. falconensis has been cultivated on both Czapek yeast extract agar (CYA) plates and Malt Extract Agar Oxoid® (MEAOX) plates. The growth morphology of the colonies can be seen in the pictures below.

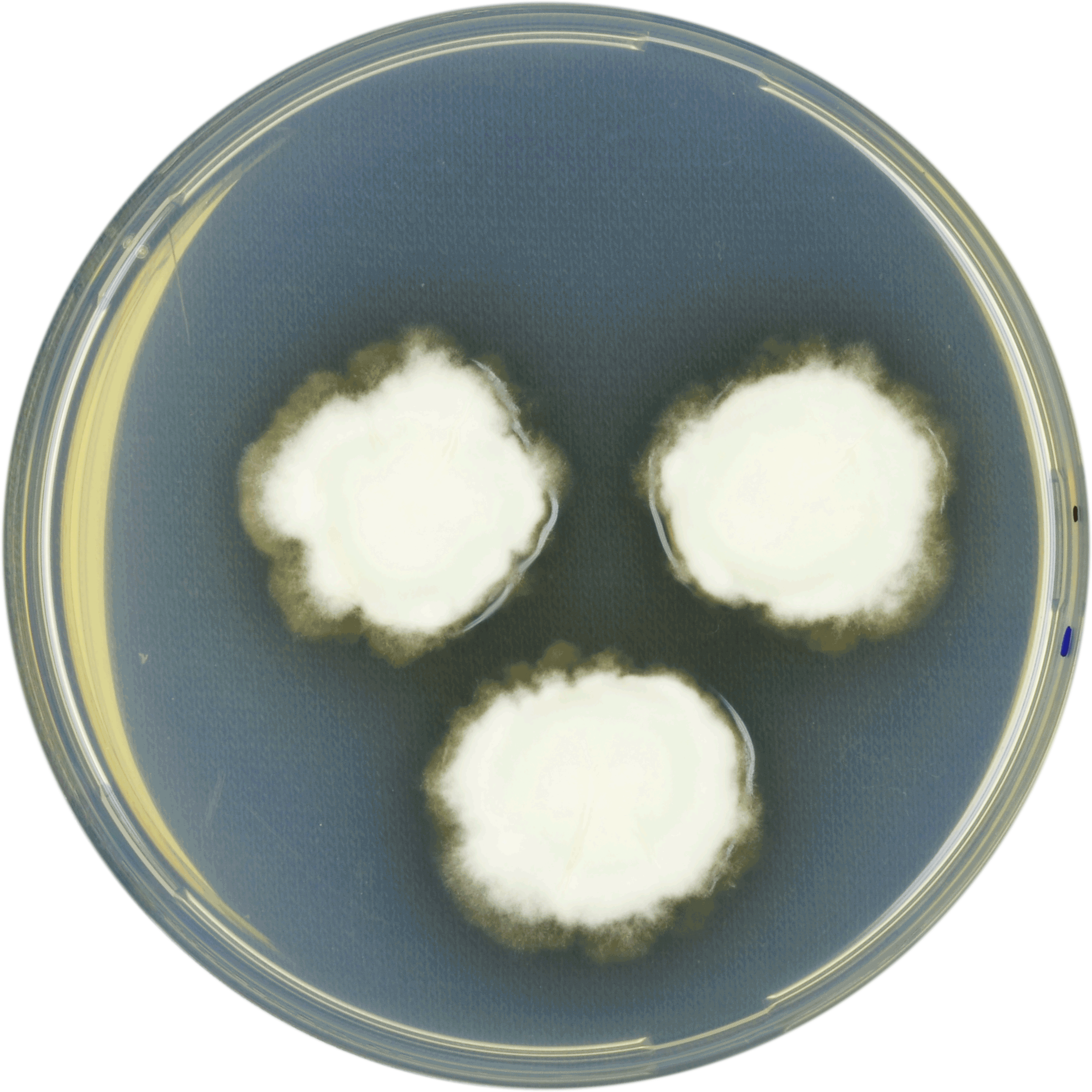
Aspergillus falconensis growing on CYA plate

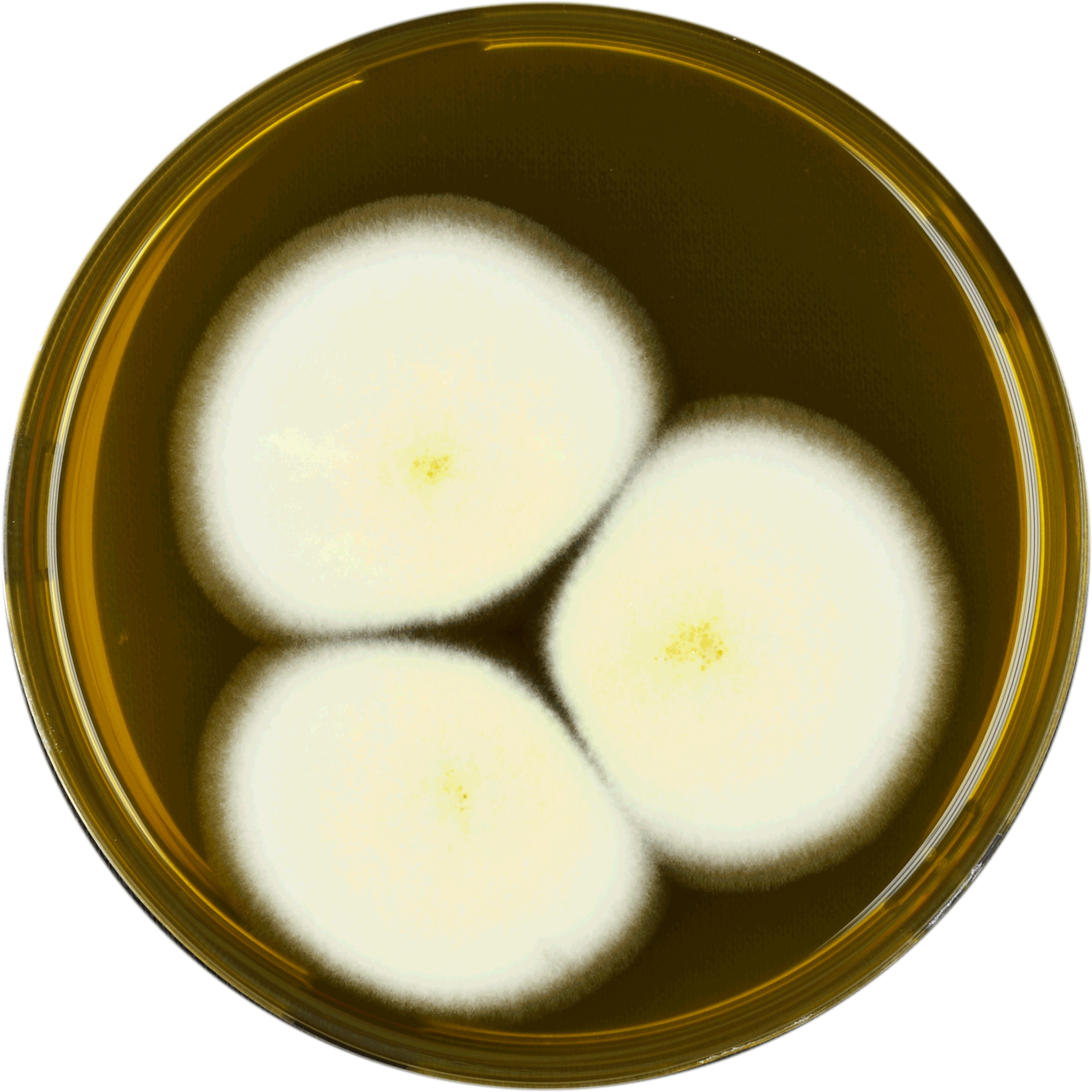
Aspergillus falconensis growing on MEAOX plate
