= Aspergillus cavernicola =

Scientific classification
- Kingdom: Fungi
- Division: Ascomycota
- Class: Eurotiomycetes
- Order: Eurotiales
- Family: Aspergillaceae
- Genus: Aspergillus
- Species: A. cavernicola

Binomial name
- Aspergillus cavernicola Lörinczi (1969)

Synonyms
- Aspergillus amylovorus

Species of fungus

Aspergillus cavernicola (also named A. amylovorus) is a species of fungus in the genus Aspergillus. It is from the Cavernicolus section. The species was first described in 1969. It has been isolated from the wall of a cave in Romania and from wheat starch in Ukraine.

== Growth and morphology ==
A. cavernicola has been cultivated on both Czapek yeast extract agar (CYA) plates and Malt Extract Agar Oxoid® (MEAOX) plates. The growth morphology of the colonies can be seen in the pictures below.

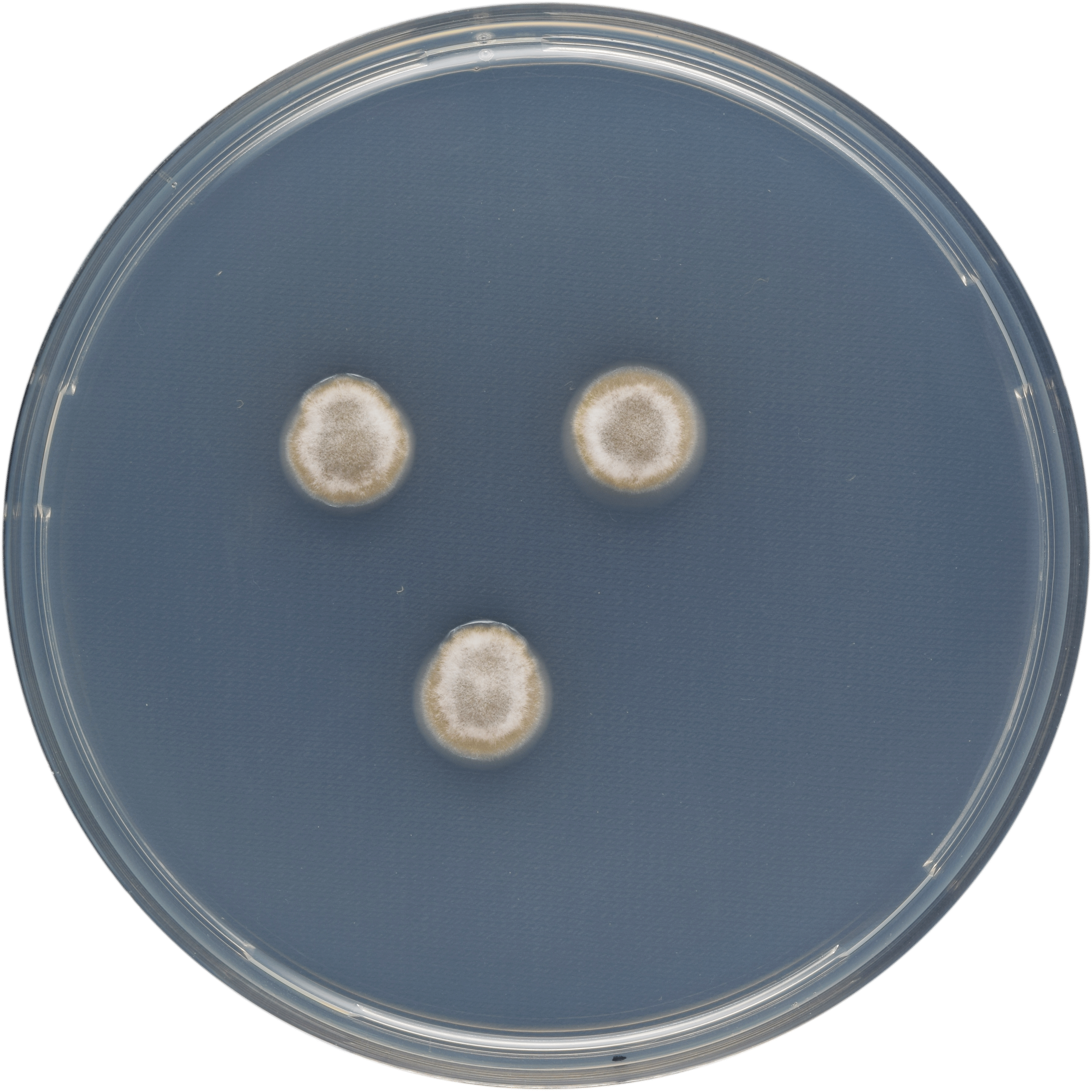
Aspergillus cavernicola growing on CYA plate

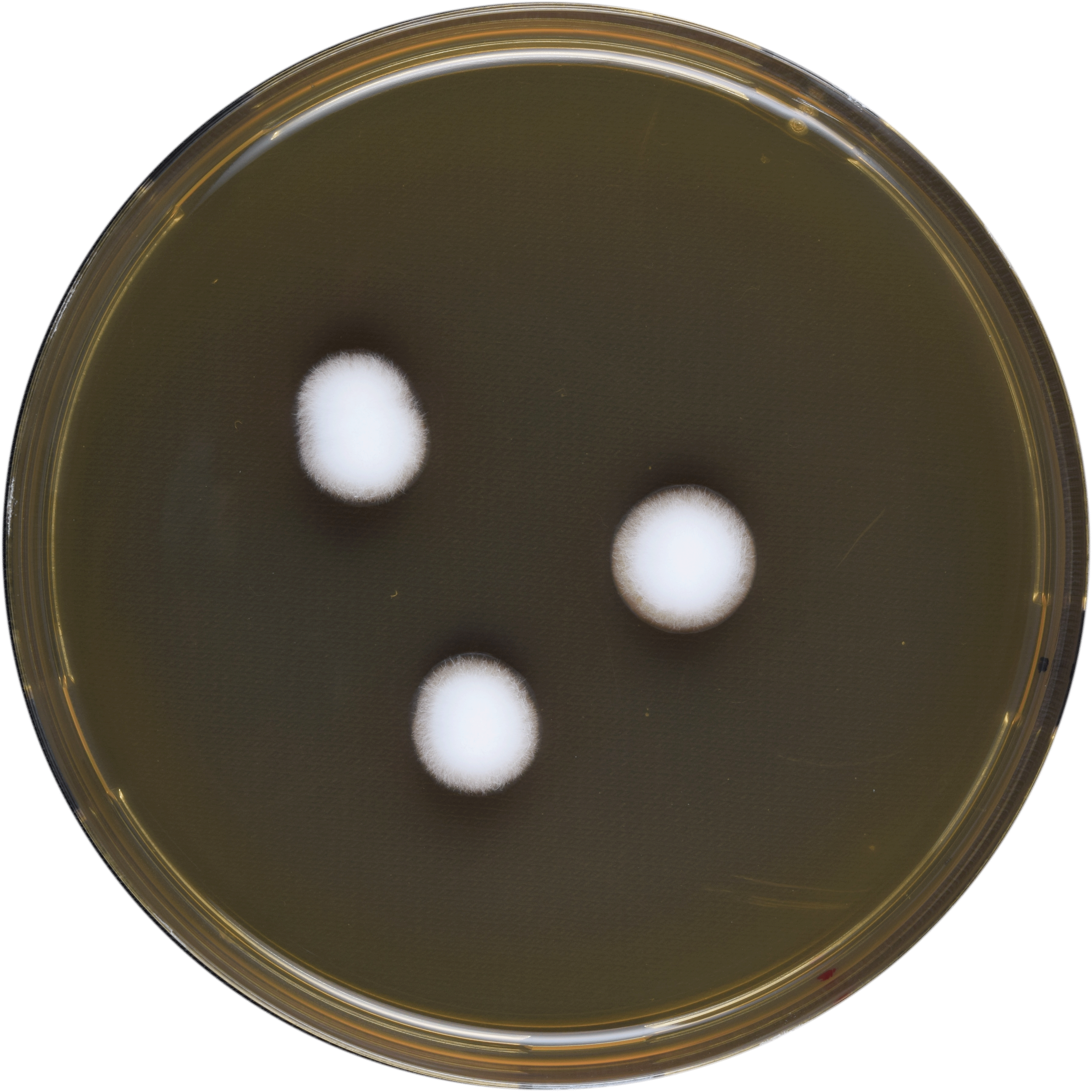
Aspergillus cavernicola growing on MEAOX plate
