= Aspergillus filifer =

Scientific classification
- Kingdom: Fungi
- Division: Ascomycota
- Class: Eurotiomycetes
- Order: Eurotiales
- Family: Aspergillaceae
- Genus: Aspergillus
- Species: A. filifer

Binomial name
- Aspergillus filifer Zalar, Frisvad & Samson (2008)

Synonyms
- Aspergillus chinensis

Species of fungus

Aspergillus filifer is a species of fungus in the genus Aspergillus. It is from the Nidulantes section. The species was first described in 2008. It has been reported to produce shamixanthones and varitriol.
