= Aspergillus griseoaurantiacus =

Scientific classification
- Kingdom: Fungi
- Division: Ascomycota
- Class: Eurotiomycetes
- Order: Eurotiales
- Family: Aspergillaceae
- Genus: Aspergillus
- Species: A. griseoaurantiacus

Binomial name
- Aspergillus griseoaurantiacus Visagie, Hirooka & Samson (2014)

Species of fungus

Aspergillus griseoaurantiacus is a species of fungus in the genus Aspergillus. It is from the Versicolores section. The species was first described in 2014.
