= Aspergillus insuetus =

Scientific classification
- Kingdom: Fungi
- Division: Ascomycota
- Class: Eurotiomycetes
- Order: Eurotiales
- Family: Aspergillaceae
- Genus: Aspergillus
- Species: A. insuetus

Binomial name
- Aspergillus insuetus (Bainier) Thom & Church (1929)

Species of fungus

Aspergillus insuetus is a species of fungus in the genus Aspergillus. It is from the Usti section. The species was first described in 1929. It has been reported to produce drimans, ophiobolin G, and ophiobolin H.

== Growth and morphology ==
A. insuetus has been cultivated on both Czapek yeast extract agar (CYA) plates and Malt Extract Agar Oxoid® (MEAOX) plates. The growth morphology of the colonies can be seen in the pictures below.

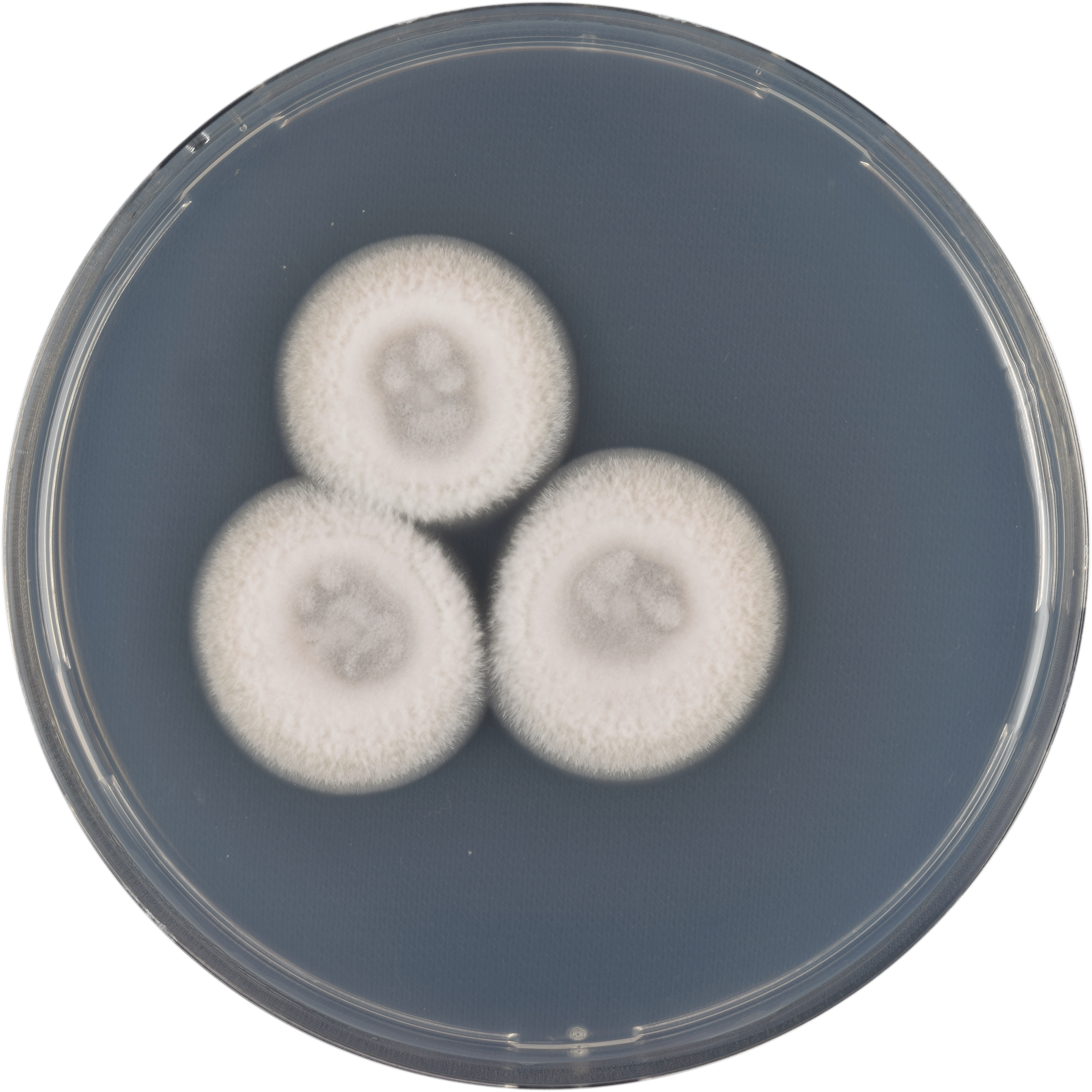
Aspergillus insuetus growing on CYA plate

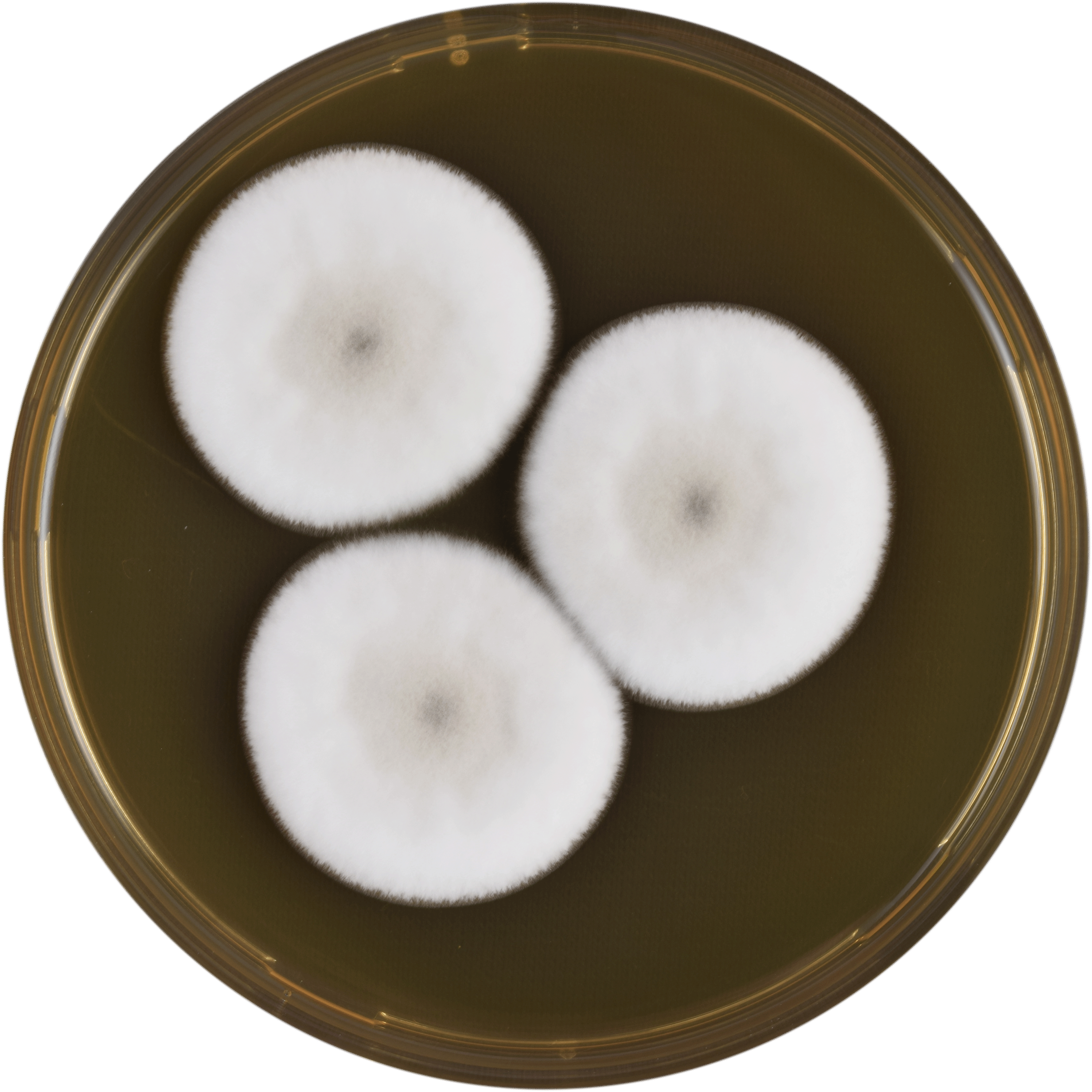
Aspergillus insuetus growing on MEAOX plate
