= Aspergillus lucknowensis =

Scientific classification
- Kingdom: Fungi
- Division: Ascomycota
- Class: Eurotiomycetes
- Order: Eurotiales
- Family: Aspergillaceae
- Genus: Aspergillus
- Species: A. lucknowensis

Binomial name
- Aspergillus lucknowensis J.N. Rai, J.P. Tewari & S.C. Agarwal (1968)

Species of fungus

Aspergillus lucknowensis is a species of fungus in the genus Aspergillus. It is from the Usti section. The species was first described in 1968.
