= Aspergillus bisporus =

Scientific classification
- Kingdom: Fungi
- Division: Ascomycota
- Class: Eurotiomycetes
- Order: Eurotiales
- Family: Aspergillaceae
- Genus: Aspergillus
- Species: A. bisporus

Binomial name
- Aspergillus bisporus Kwon & Chung (1971)

Species of fungus

Aspergillus bisporus is a species of fungus in the genus Aspergillus. It is from the Bispori section. The species was first described in 1971.

The genome of A. bisporus was sequenced as a part of the Aspergillus whole-genome sequencing project - a project dedicated to performing whole-genome sequencing of all members of the genus Aspergillus. The genome assembly size was 27.10 Mbp.

== Growth and morphology ==
Aspergillus bisporus has been cultivated on both Czapek yeast extract agar (CYA) plates and Malt Extract Agar Oxoid® (MEAOX) plates. The growth morphology of the colonies can be seen in the pictures below.

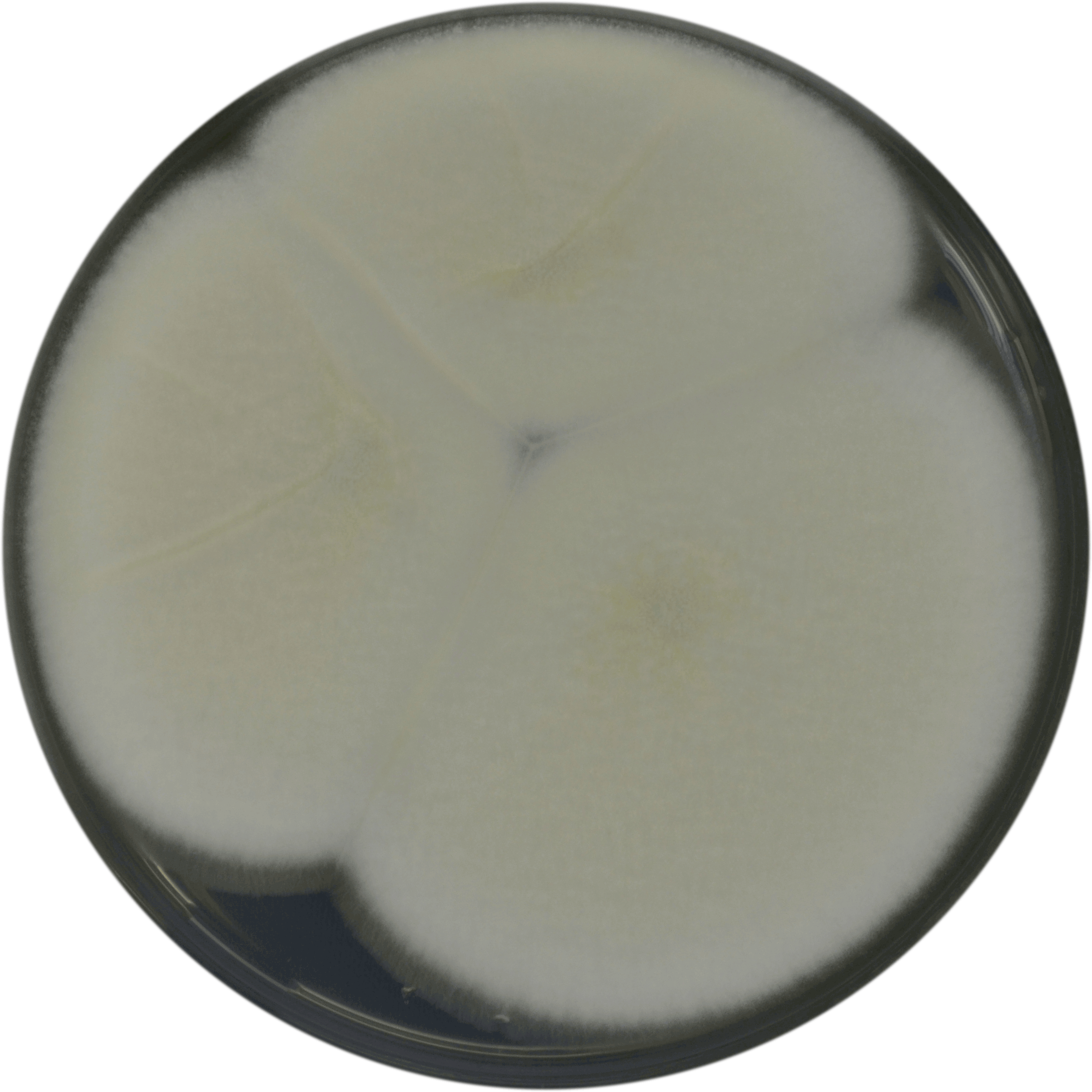
Aspergillus bisporus growing on CYA plate

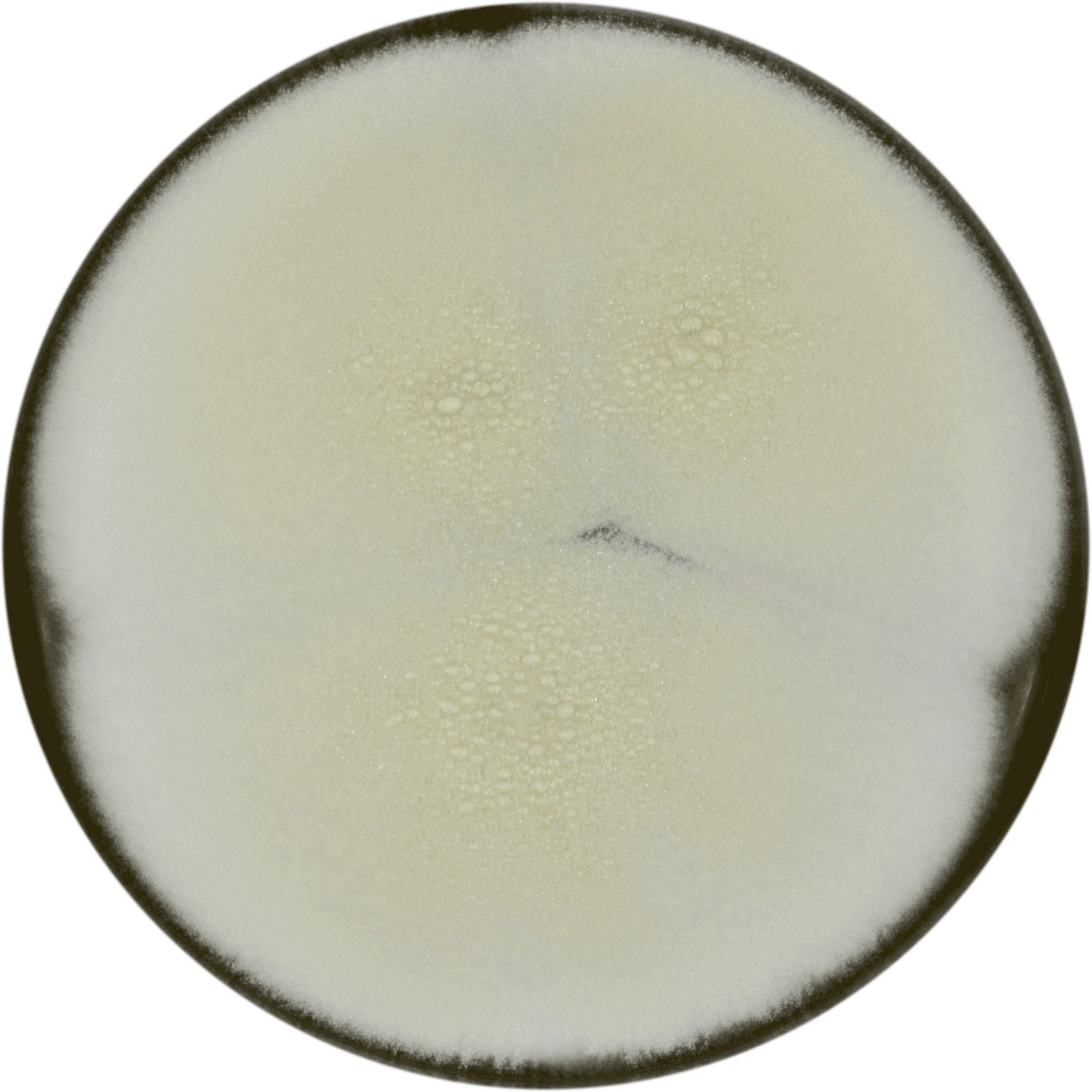
Aspergillus bisporus growing on MEAOX plate
