= Aspergillus israelensis =

Scientific classification
- Kingdom: Fungi
- Division: Ascomycota
- Class: Eurotiomycetes
- Order: Eurotiales
- Family: Aspergillaceae
- Genus: Aspergillus
- Species: A. israelensis

Binomial name
- Aspergillus israelensis A.J. Chen, Frisvad & Samson (2016)

Species of fungus

Aspergillus israelensis is a species of fungus in the genus Aspergillus. It is from the Nidulantes section. The species was first described in 2016. It has been isolated from the Dead Sea in Israel.
