= Aspergillus croceus =

Scientific classification
- Kingdom: Fungi
- Division: Ascomycota
- Class: Eurotiomycetes
- Order: Eurotiales
- Family: Aspergillaceae
- Genus: Aspergillus
- Species: A. croceus

Binomial name
- Aspergillus croceus Hubka, A. Nováková, Frisvad, S.W. Peterson, M. Kolařík (2016)

Species of fungus

Aspergillus croceus is a species of fungus in the genus Aspergillus. It is from the Nidulantes section. The species was first described in 2016. It has been isolated from cave sediment in Spain. It has been reported to produce kotanins, norsolorinic acid, orlandin, siderin, sterigmatocystin, and versicolorins.

== Growth and morphology ==
A. croceus has been cultivated on both Czapek yeast extract agar (CYA) plates and Malt Extract Agar Oxoid® (MEAOX) plates. The growth morphology of the colonies can be seen in the pictures below.

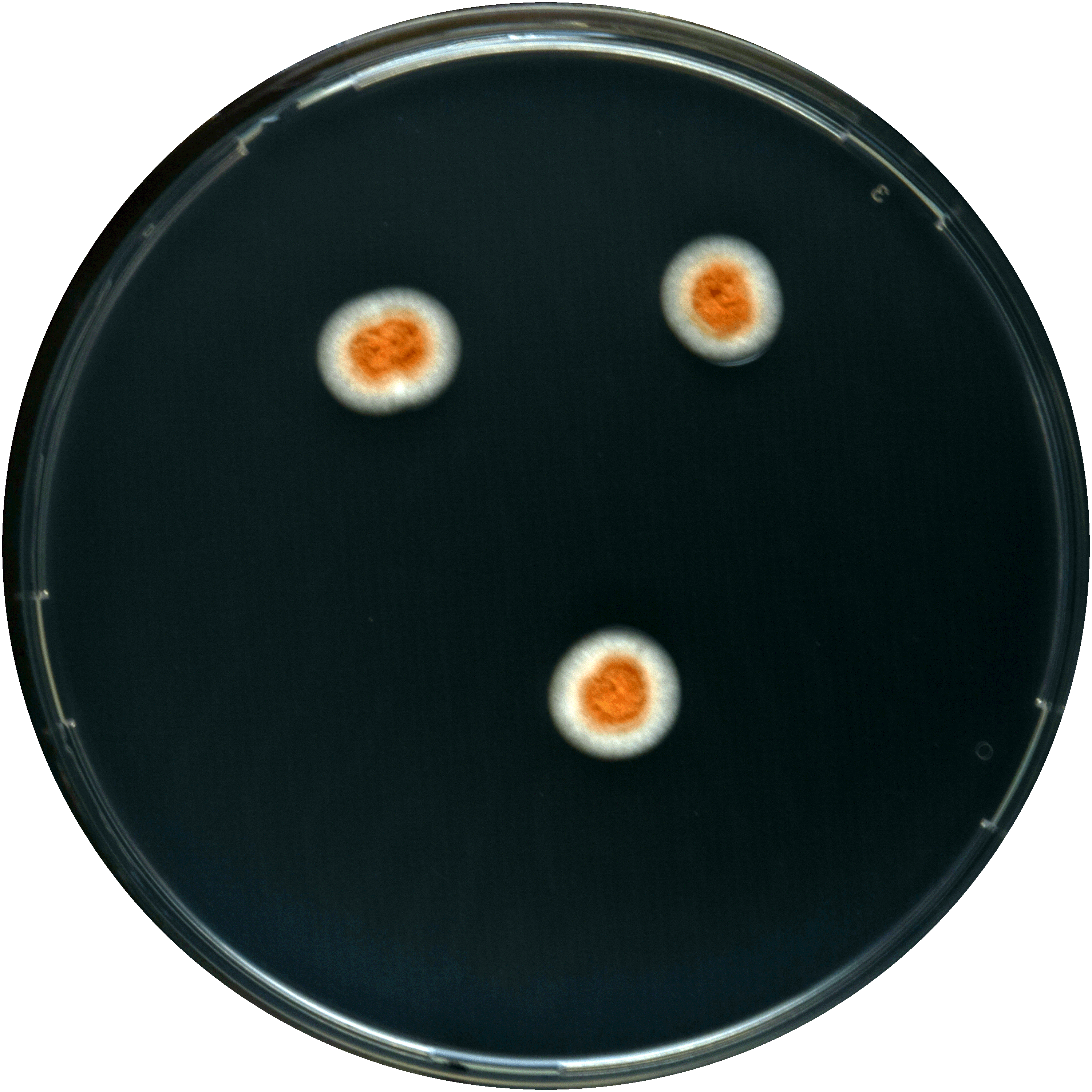
Aspergillus croceus growing on CYA plate

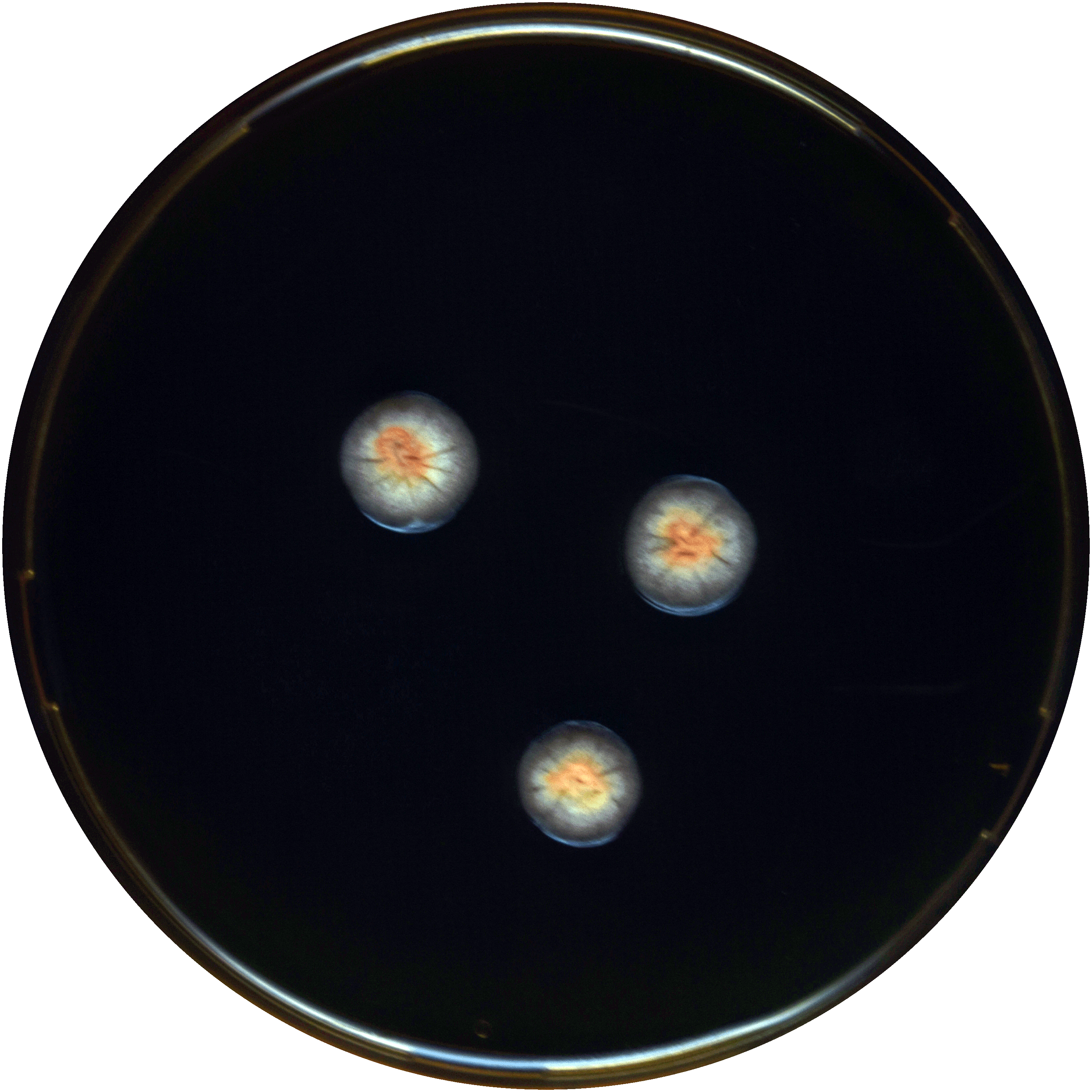
Aspergillus croceus growing on MEAOX plate
