= Aspergillus germanicus =

Scientific classification
- Kingdom: Fungi
- Division: Ascomycota
- Class: Eurotiomycetes
- Order: Eurotiales
- Family: Aspergillaceae
- Genus: Aspergillus
- Species: A. germanicus

Binomial name
- Aspergillus germanicus Frisvad, Varga & Samson (2011)

Type strain
- DTO 27D9, CBS 123887, CBS H-20636, DTO 27-D9

Species of fungus

Aspergillus germanicus is a species of fungus in the genus Aspergillus which has been isolated from indoor air in Germany. It is from the Usti section.

== Growth and morphology ==
A. germanicus has been cultivated on both Czapek yeast extract agar (CYA) plates and Malt Extract Agar Oxoid® (MEAOX) plates. The growth morphology of the colonies can be seen in the pictures below.

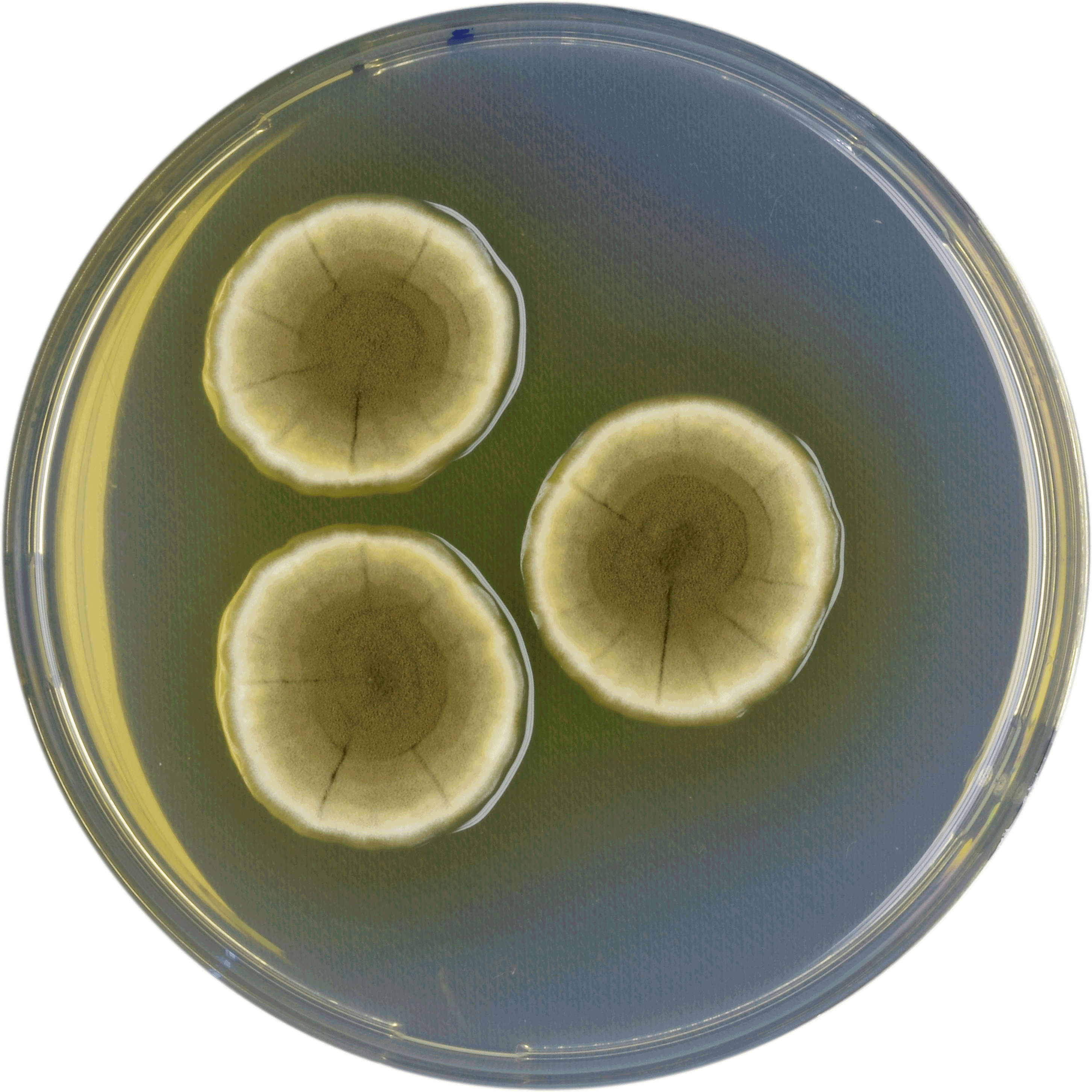
Aspergillus germanicus growing on CYA plate

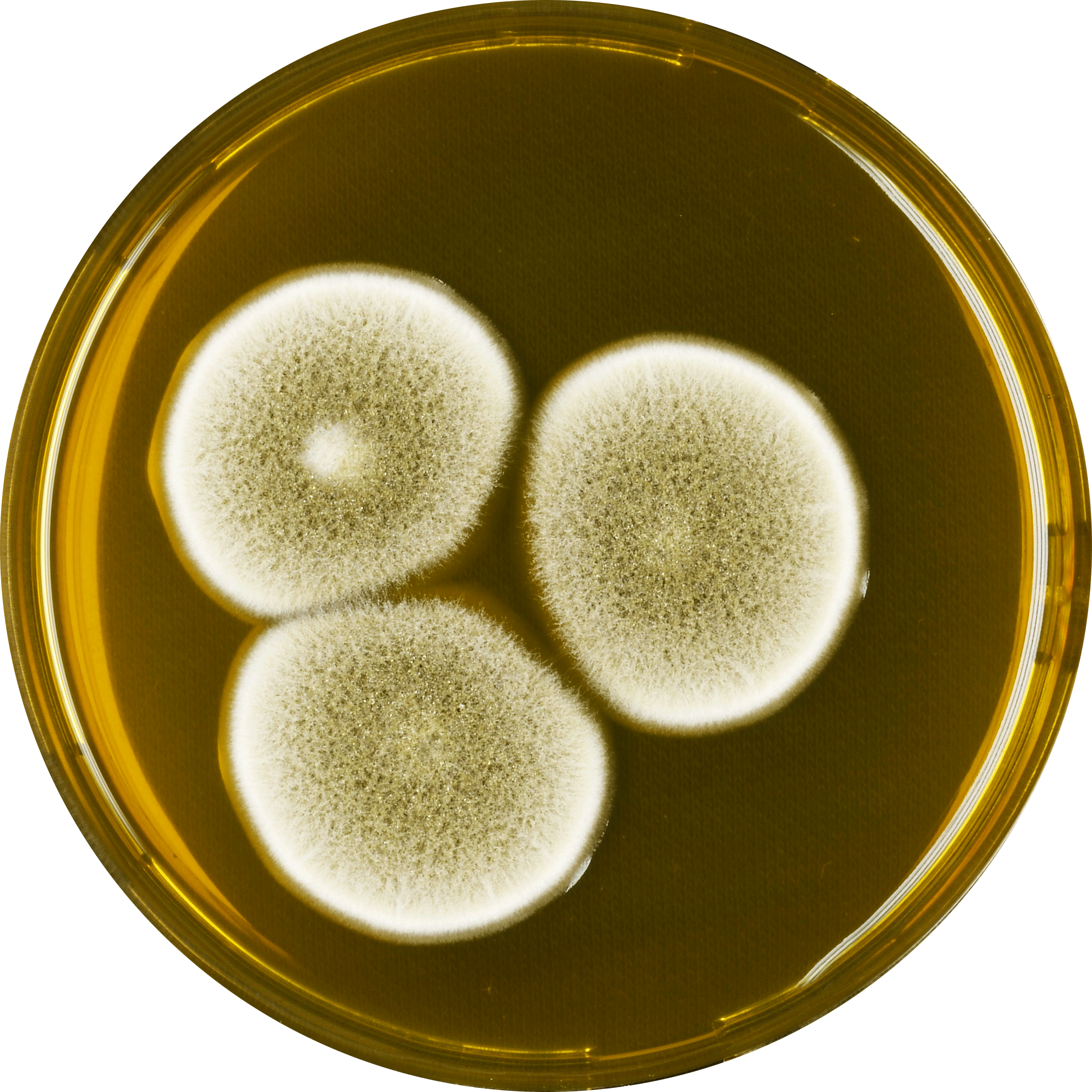
Aspergillus germanicus growing on MEAOX plate
