= Aspergillus pachycristatus =

Scientific classification
- Kingdom: Fungi
- Division: Ascomycota
- Class: Eurotiomycetes
- Order: Eurotiales
- Family: Aspergillaceae
- Genus: Aspergillus
- Species: A. miraensis

Binomial name
- Aspergillus miraensis Matsuzawa, Horie & Yaguchi (2012)

Species of fungus

Aspergillus pachycristatus is a species of fungus in the genus Aspergillus. It is from the Nidulantes section. The species was first described in 2012. It has been isolated from soil in Xinjiang in China. It has been reported to produce echinocandins.

== Growth and morphology ==
A. pachycristatus has been cultivated on both Czapek yeast extract agar (CYA) plates and Malt Extract Agar Oxoid® (MEAOX) plates. The growth morphology of the colonies can be seen in the pictures below.

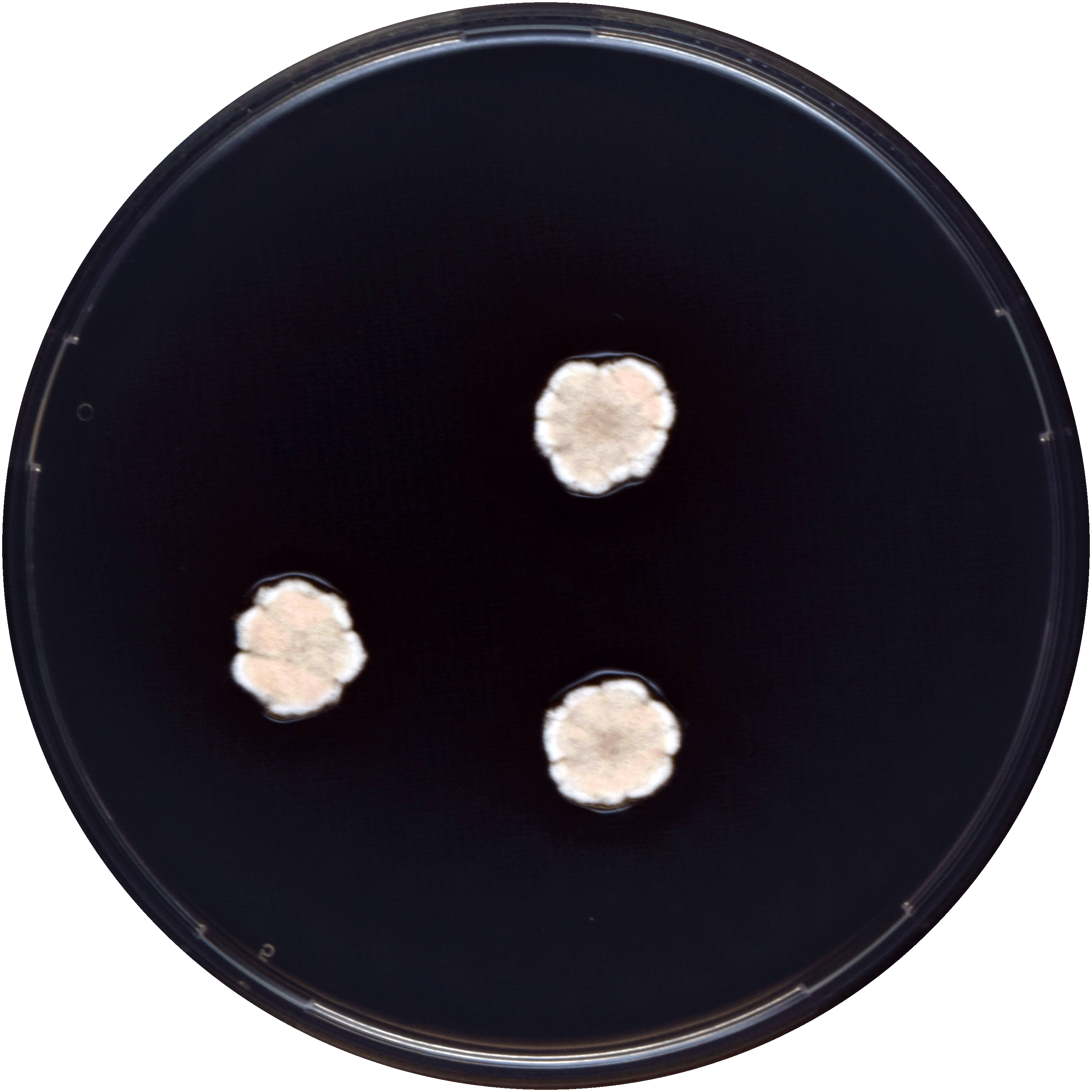
Aspergillus pachycristatus growing on CYA plate

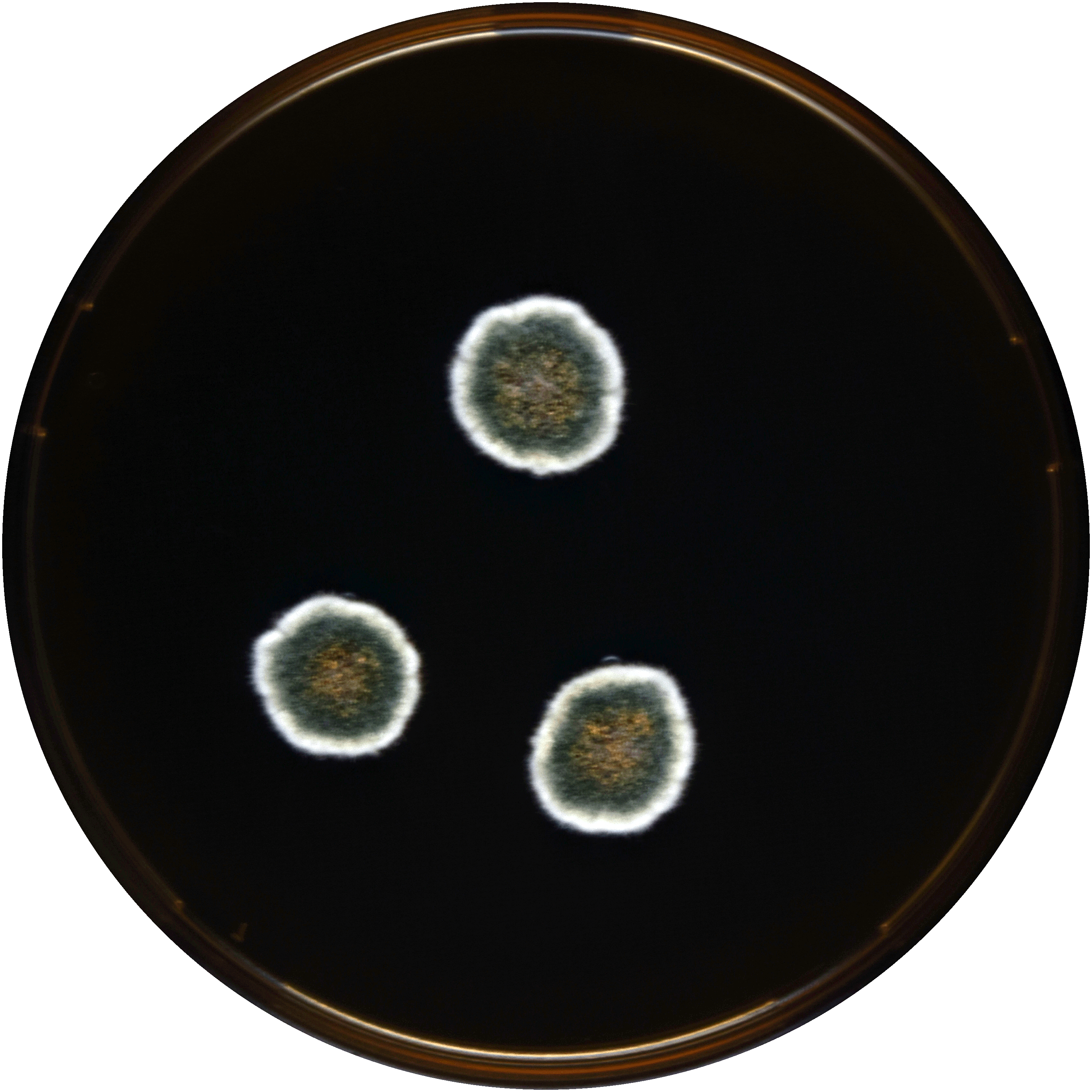
Aspergillus pachycristatus growing on MEAOX plate
