= Aspergillus dromiae =

Scientific classification
- Kingdom: Fungi
- Division: Ascomycota
- Class: Eurotiomycetes
- Order: Eurotiales
- Family: Aspergillaceae
- Genus: Aspergillus
- Species: A. dromiae

Binomial name
- Aspergillus dromiae A.J. Chen, Frisvad & Samson (2016)

Species of fungus

Aspergillus dromiae is a species of fungus in the genus Aspergillus. It is from the Nidulantes section. The species was first described in 2016. It has been isolated from the Dromia erythropus crab in Venezuela.

== Growth and morphology ==
A. dromiae has been cultivated on both Czapek yeast extract agar (CYA) plates and Malt Extract Agar Oxoid® (MEAOX) plates. The growth morphology of the colonies can be seen in the pictures below.

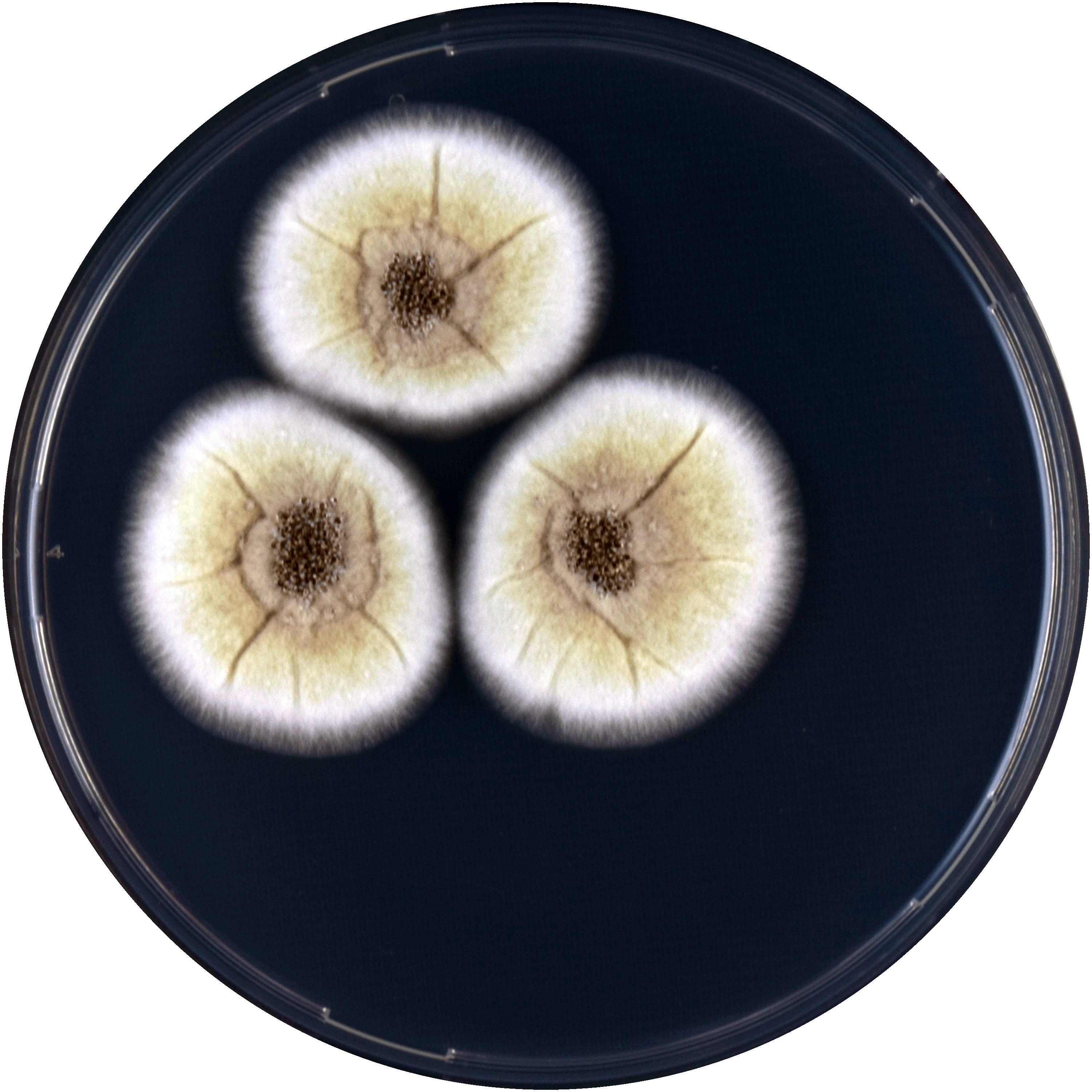
Aspergillus dromiae growing on CYA plate

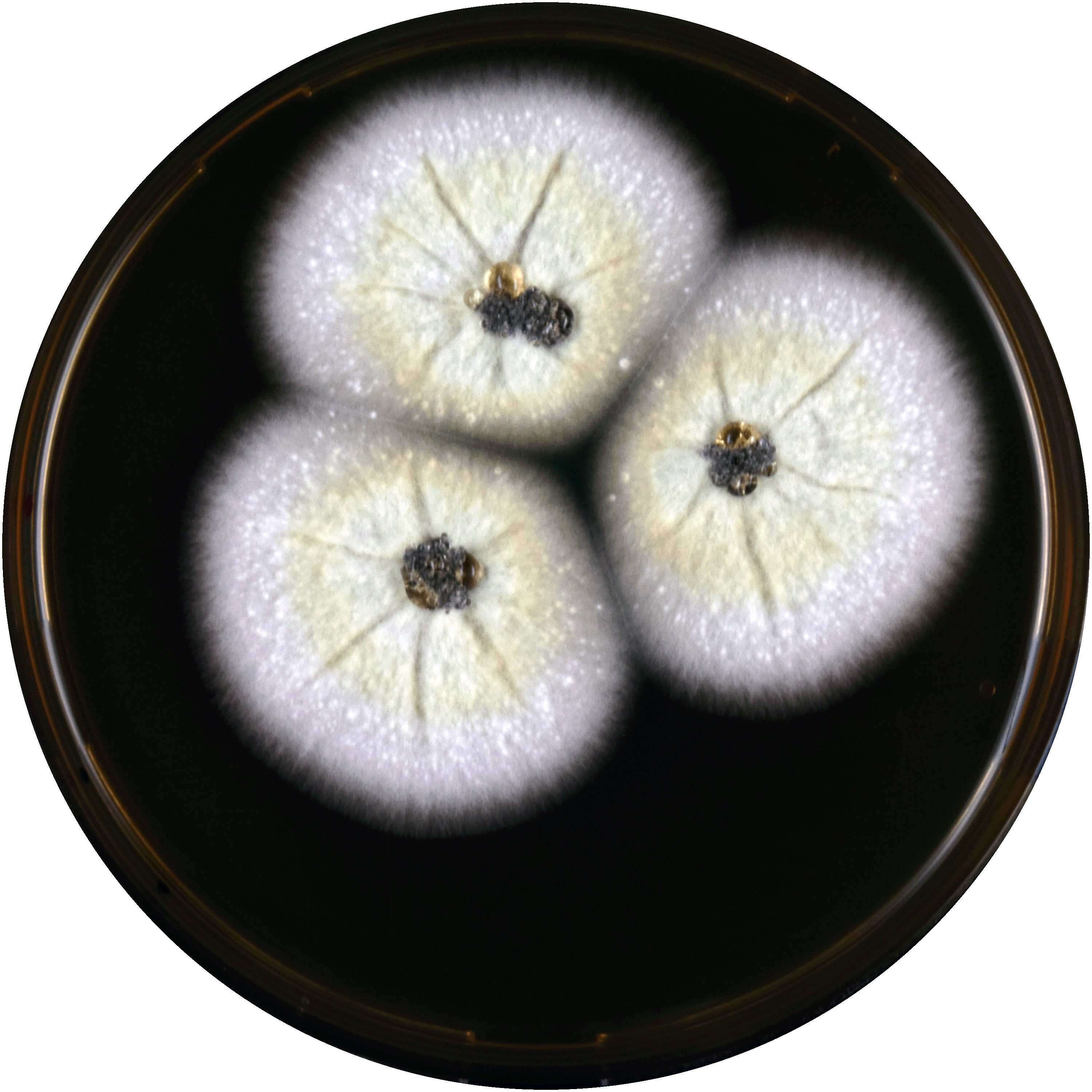
Aspergillus dromiae growing on MEAOX plate
