= Aspergillus porphyreostipitatus =

Scientific classification
- Kingdom: Fungi
- Division: Ascomycota
- Class: Eurotiomycetes
- Order: Eurotiales
- Family: Aspergillaceae
- Genus: Aspergillus
- Species: A. porphyreostipitatus

Binomial name
- Aspergillus porphyreostipitatus Visagie, Hirooka & Samson (2014)

Species of fungus

Aspergillus baeticus is a species of fungus in the genus Aspergillus. It is from the Usti section. The species was first described in 2014.
