= Aspergillus anthodesmis =

Scientific classification
- Kingdom: Fungi
- Division: Ascomycota
- Class: Eurotiomycetes
- Order: Eurotiales
- Family: Aspergillaceae
- Genus: Aspergillus
- Species: A. anthodesmis

Binomial name
- Aspergillus anthodesmis Bartoli & Maggi (1979)

Species of fungus

Aspergillus anthodesmis is a species of fungus in the genus Aspergillus. It is from the Sparsi section. The species was first described in 1979. It has been reported to produce gregatins.

== Growth and morphology ==
A. anthodesmis has been cultivated on both Czapek yeast extract agar (CYA) plates and Malt Extract Agar Oxoid® (MEAOX) plates. The growth morphology of the colonies can be seen in the pictures below.

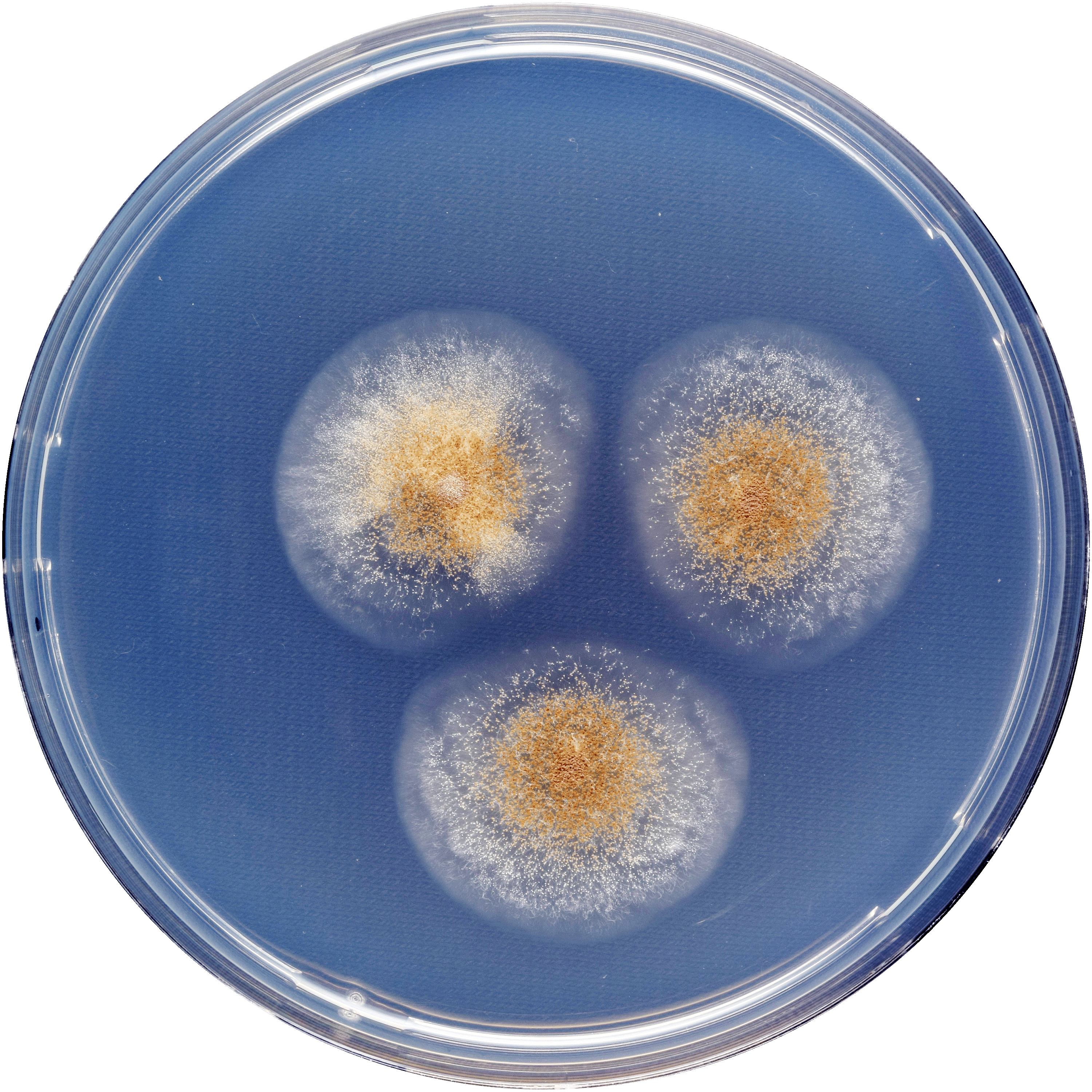
Aspergillus anthodesmis growing on CYA plate

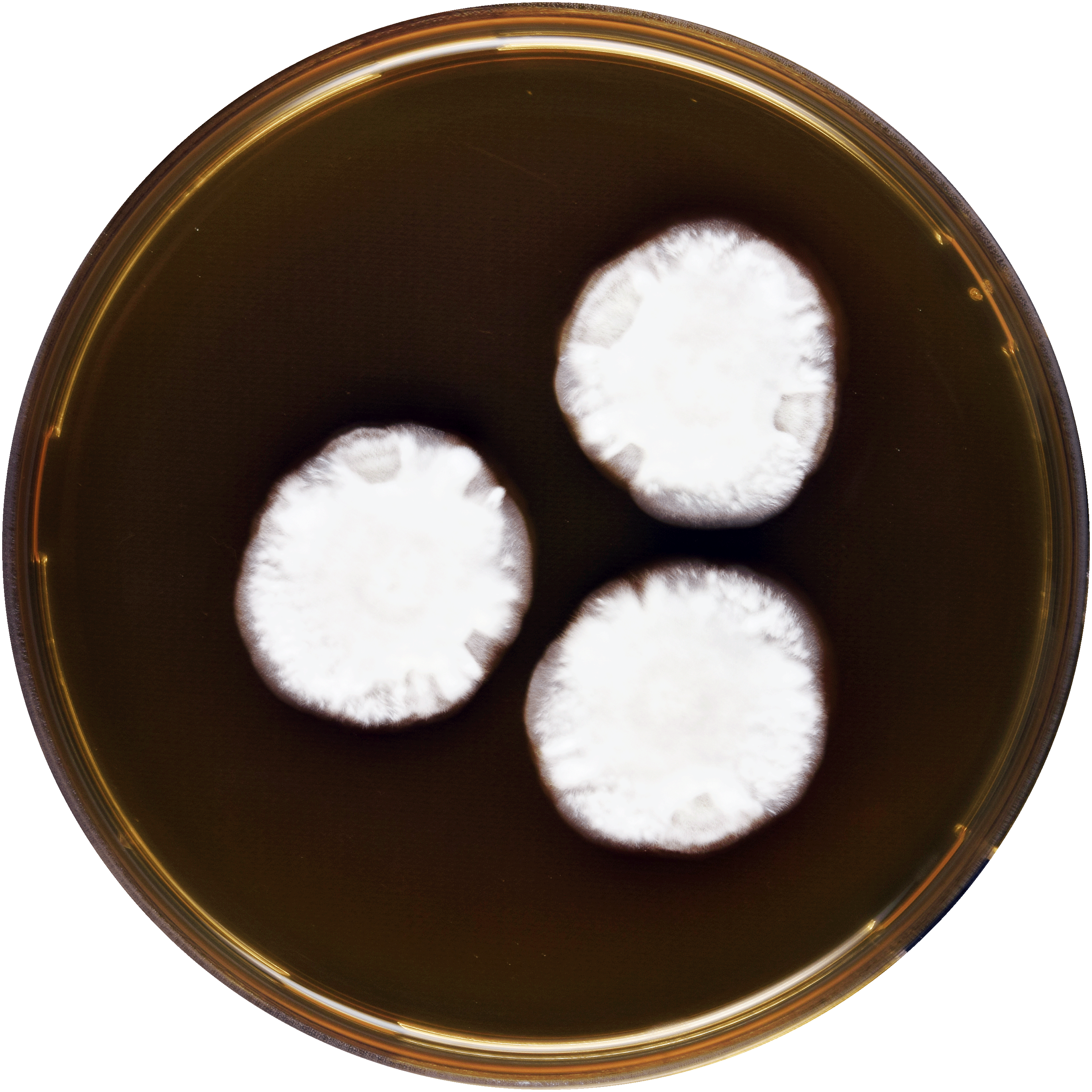
Aspergillus anthodesmis growing on MEAOX plate
