= Aspergillus pseudodeflectus =

Scientific classification
- Kingdom: Fungi
- Division: Ascomycota
- Class: Eurotiomycetes
- Order: Eurotiales
- Family: Aspergillaceae
- Genus: Aspergillus
- Species: A. pseudodeflectus

Binomial name
- Aspergillus pseudodeflectus Samson & Mouchacca (1975)

Species of fungus

Aspergillus pseudodeflectus is a species of fungus in the genus Aspergillus. It is from the Usti section. The species was first described in 1975. It has been reported to produce drimans, ophiobolins G and H, and austins.

== Growth and morphology ==
A. pseudodeflectus has been cultivated on both Czapek yeast extract agar (CYA) plates and Malt Extract Agar Oxoid® (MEAOX) plates. The growth morphology of the colonies can be seen in the pictures below.

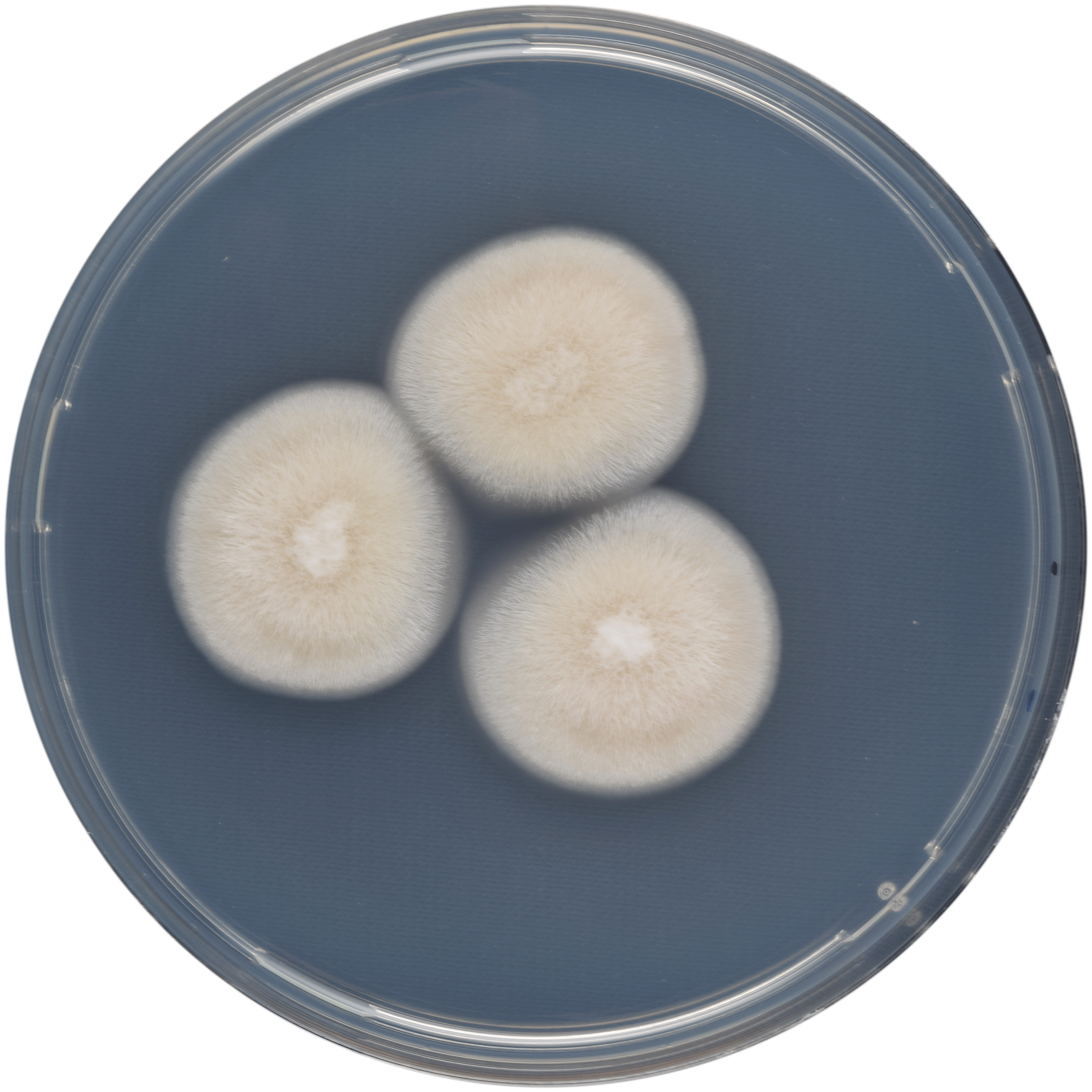
Aspergillus pseudodeflectus growing on CYA plate

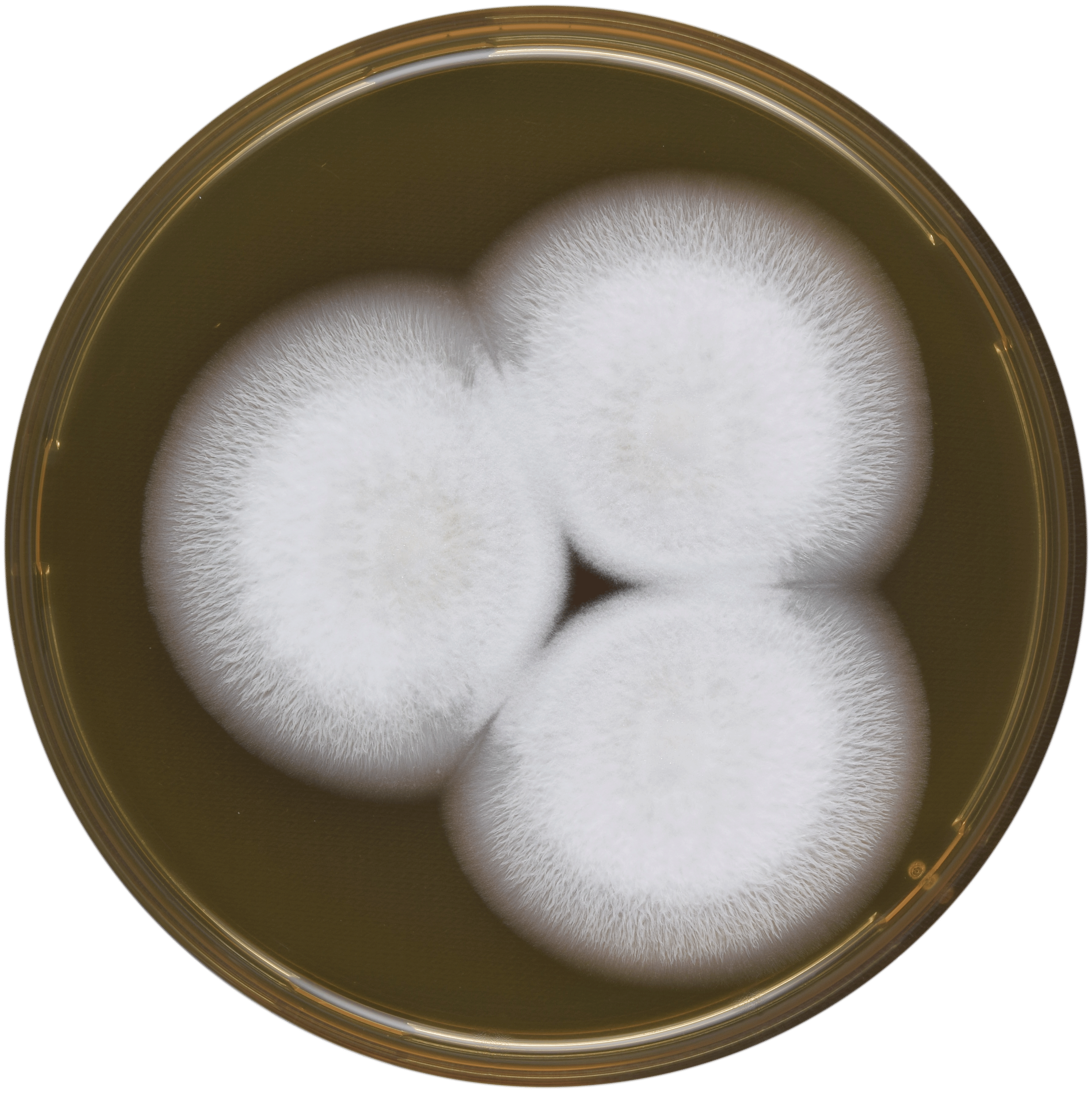
Aspergillus pseudodeflectus growing on MEAOX plate
