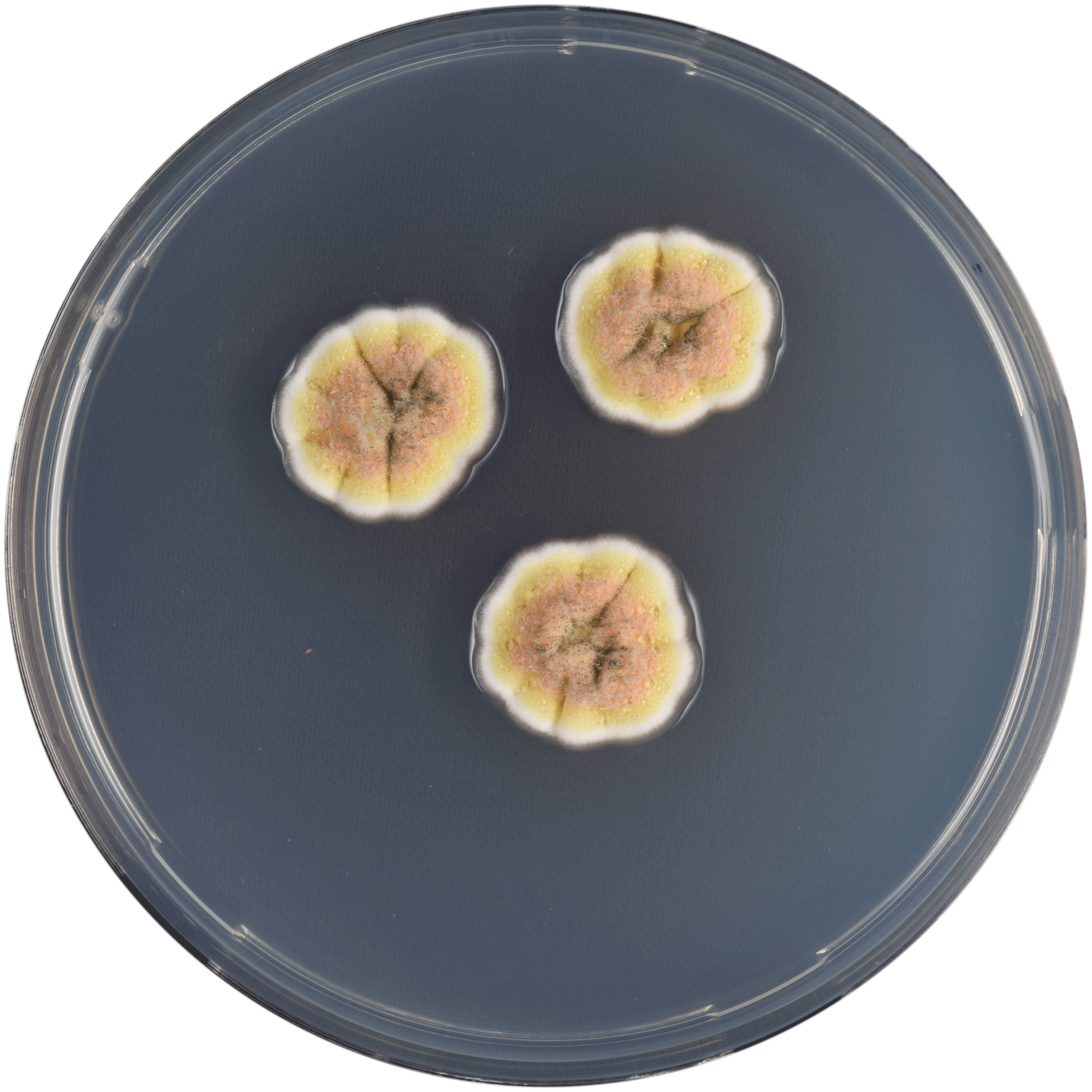

Scientific classification
- Kingdom: Fungi
- Division: Ascomycota
- Class: Eurotiomycetes
- Order: Eurotiales
- Family: Aspergillaceae
- Genus: Aspergillus
- Species: A. silvaticus

Binomial name
- Aspergillus silvaticus Fennell & Raper (1955)

= Aspergillus silvaticus =

Species of fungus

Aspergillus silvaticus is a species of fungus in the genus Aspergillus. It is from the Silvati section. The species was first described in 1955.

== Growth and morphology ==
A. silvaticus has been cultivated on both Czapek yeast extract agar (CYA) plates and Malt Extract Agar Oxoid® (MEAOX) plates. The growth morphology of the colonies can be seen in the pictures below.

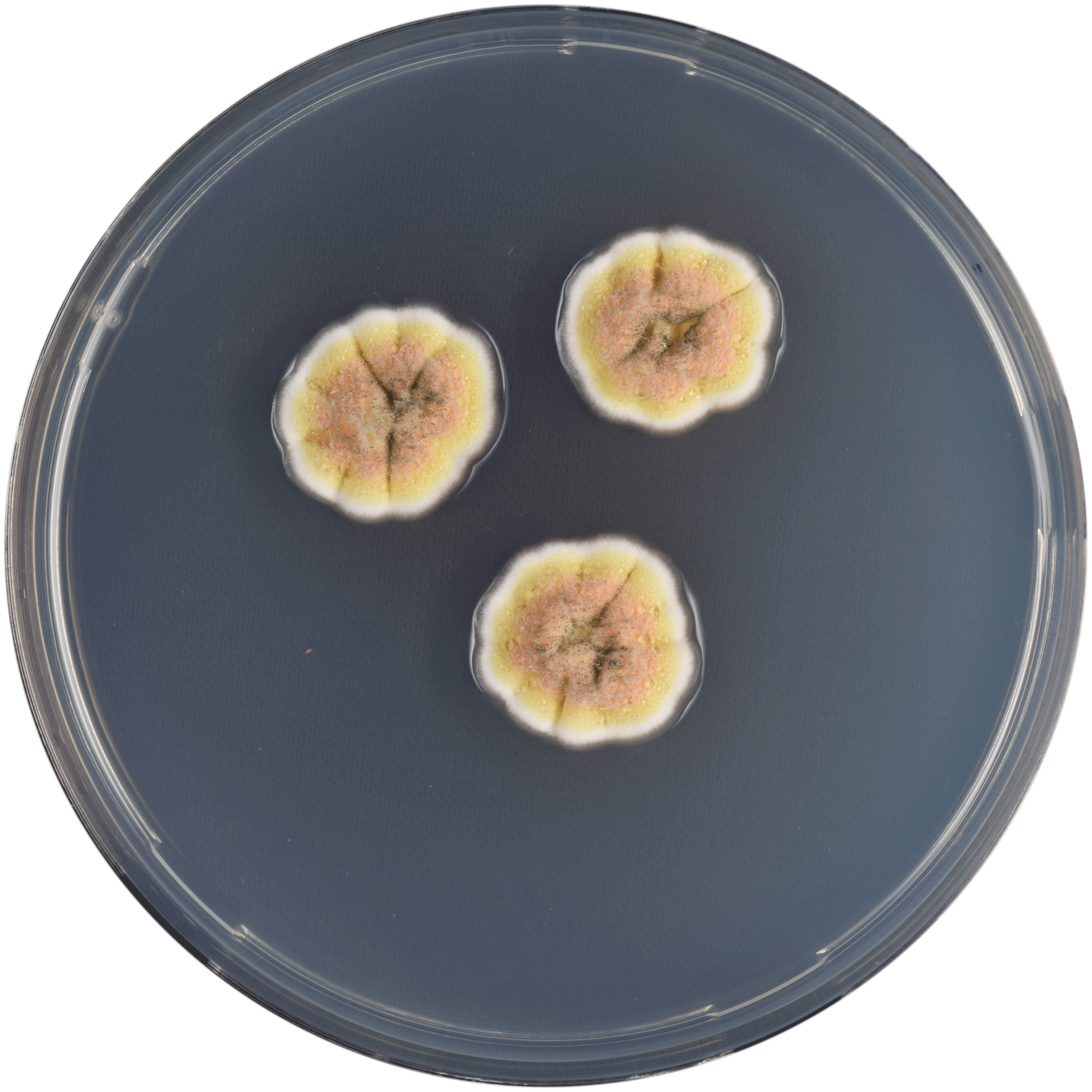
Aspergillus silvaticus growing on CYA plate

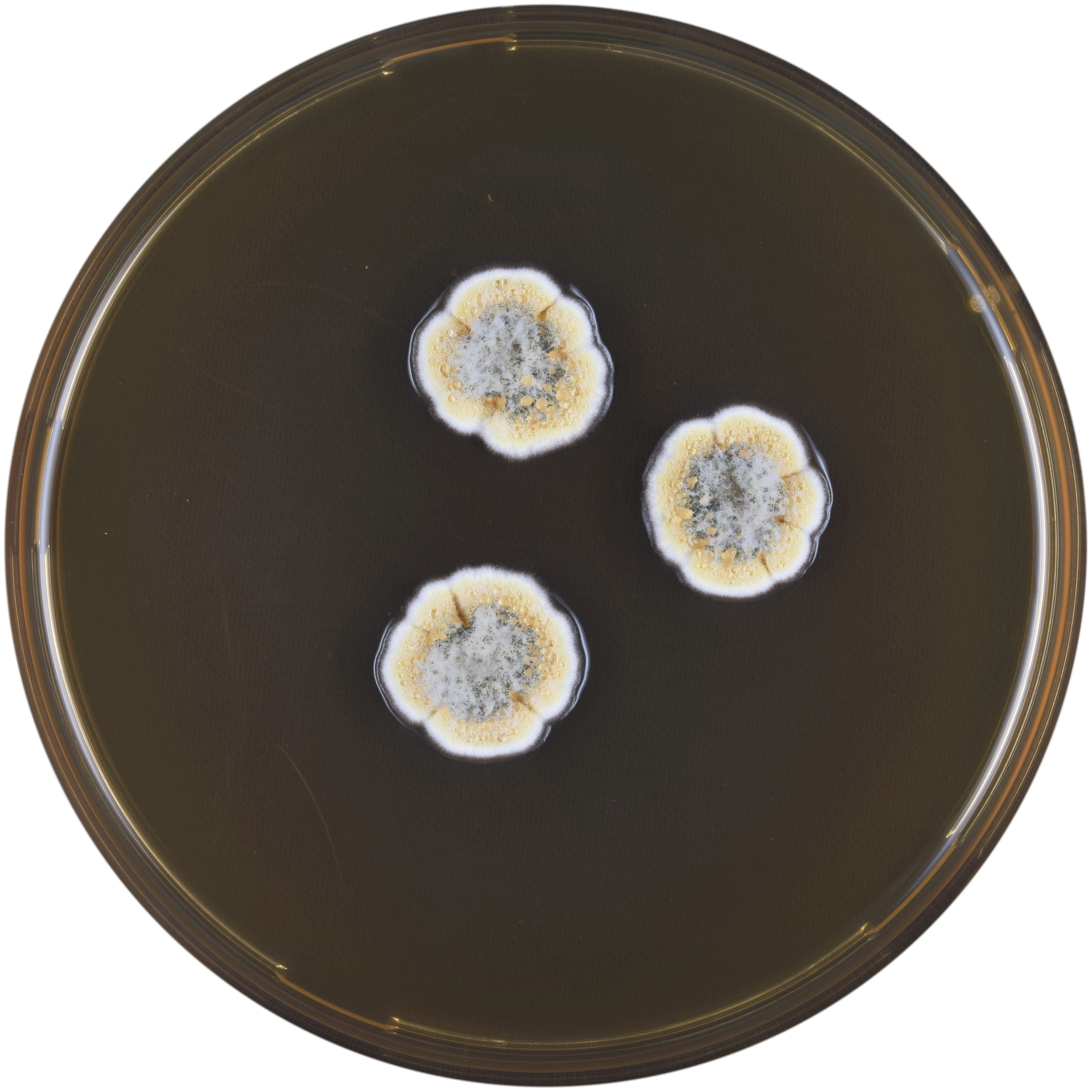
Aspergillus silvaticus growing on MEAOX plate
