= Aspergillus savannensis =

Scientific classification
- Kingdom: Fungi
- Division: Ascomycota
- Class: Eurotiomycetes
- Order: Eurotiales
- Family: Aspergillaceae
- Genus: Aspergillus
- Species: A. savannensis

Binomial name
- Aspergillus savannensis A.J. Chen, Frisvad & Samson (2016)

Species of fungus

Aspergillus savannensis is a species of fungus in the genus Aspergillus. It is from the Nidulantes section. The species was first described in 2016. It has been isolated from soil in Namibia.

== Growth and morphology ==
A. savannensis has been cultivated on both Czapek yeast extract agar (CYA) plates and Malt Extract Agar Oxoid® (MEAOX) plates. The growth morphology of the colonies can be seen in the pictures below.

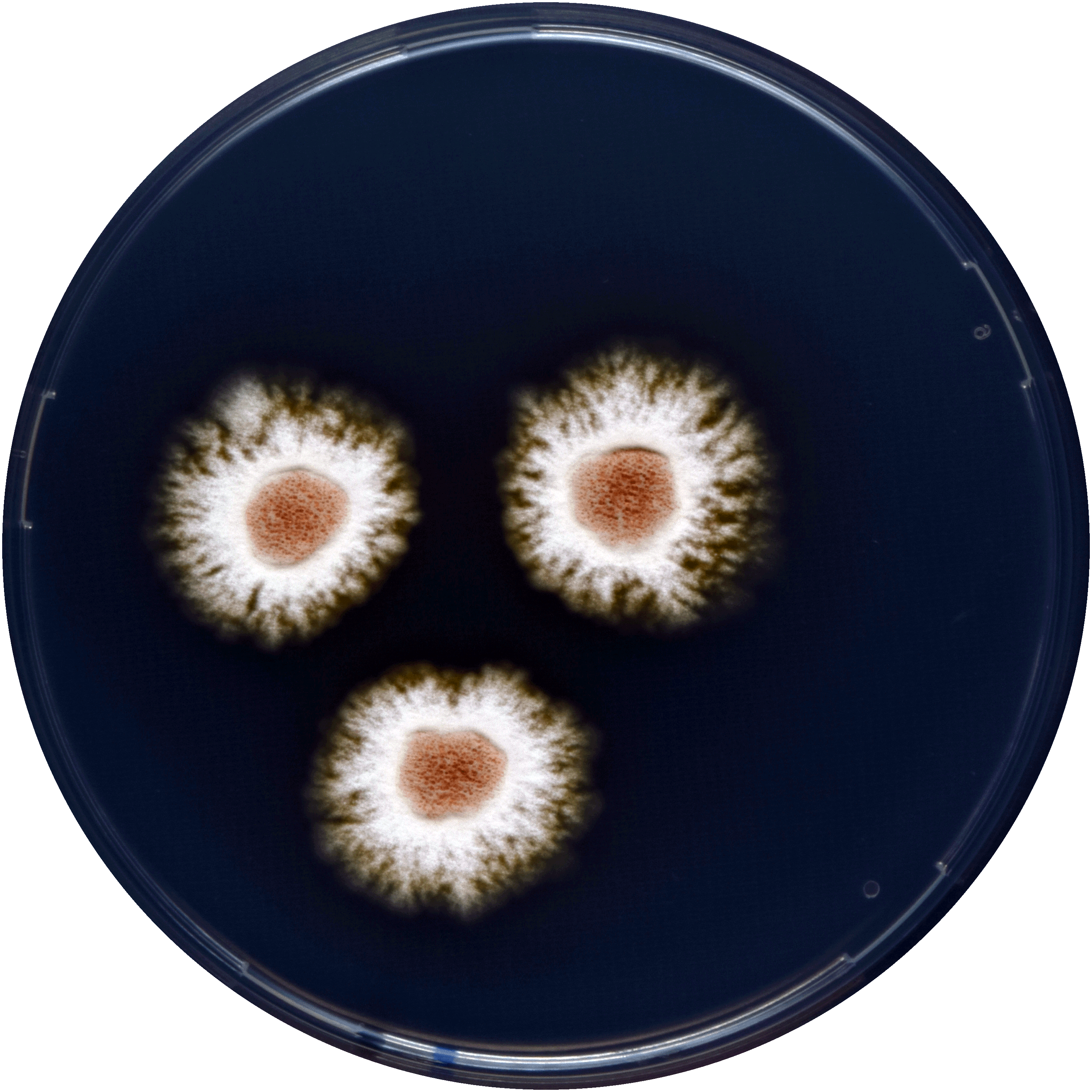
Aspergillus savannensis growing on CYA plate

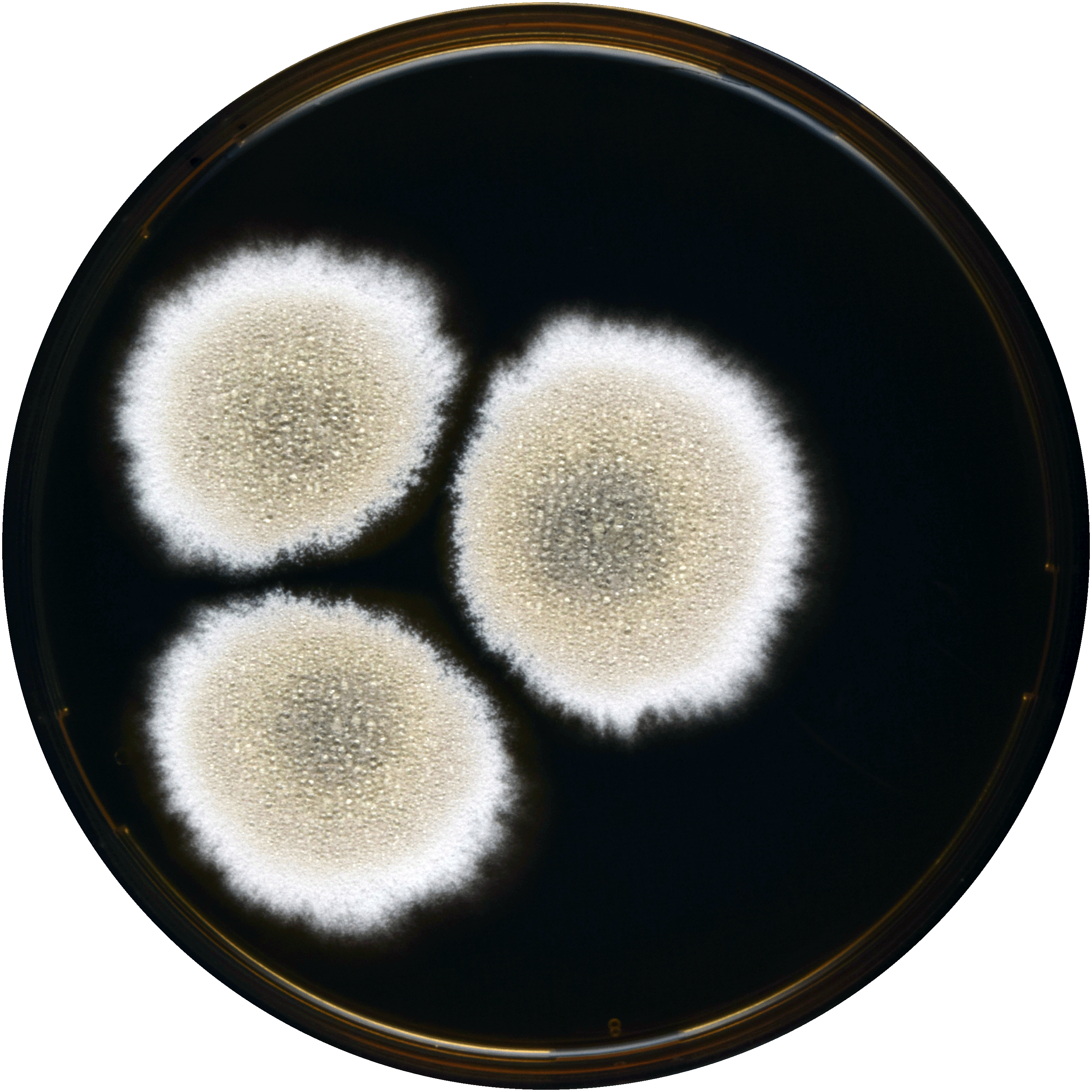
Aspergillus savannensis growing on MEAOX plate
