= Aspergillus spelunceus =

Scientific classification
- Kingdom: Fungi
- Division: Ascomycota
- Class: Eurotiomycetes
- Order: Eurotiales
- Family: Aspergillaceae
- Genus: Aspergillus
- Species: A. spelunceus

Binomial name
- Aspergillus spelunceus Raper & Fennell (1965)

Species of fungus

Aspergillus spelunceus is a species of fungus in the genus Aspergillus. It is from the Nidulantes section. The species was first described in 1965. It has been isolated from dead cane crickets on the floor of Laurel Creek Cave in West Virginia, United States.
