= Aspergillus biplanus =

Scientific classification
- Kingdom: Fungi
- Division: Ascomycota
- Class: Eurotiomycetes
- Order: Eurotiales
- Family: Aspergillaceae
- Genus: Aspergillus
- Species: A. biplanus

Binomial name
- Aspergillus biplanus Raper & Fennell 1965

Type strain
- ATCC 16858, CBS 468.65, IMI 235602, NRRL 5071, NRRL MOLD 5071, QM 8873, WB 5071

Species of fungus

Aspergillus biplanus is a species of fungus in the genus Aspergillus. It is from the Sparsi section. The species was first described in 1965. It has been isolated from soil in Costa Rica. It has been reported to produce auroglaucin.

== Growth and morphology ==
A. biplanus has been cultivated on both Czapek yeast extract agar (CYA) plates and Malt Extract Agar Oxoid® (MEAOX) plates. The growth morphology of the colonies can be seen in the pictures below.

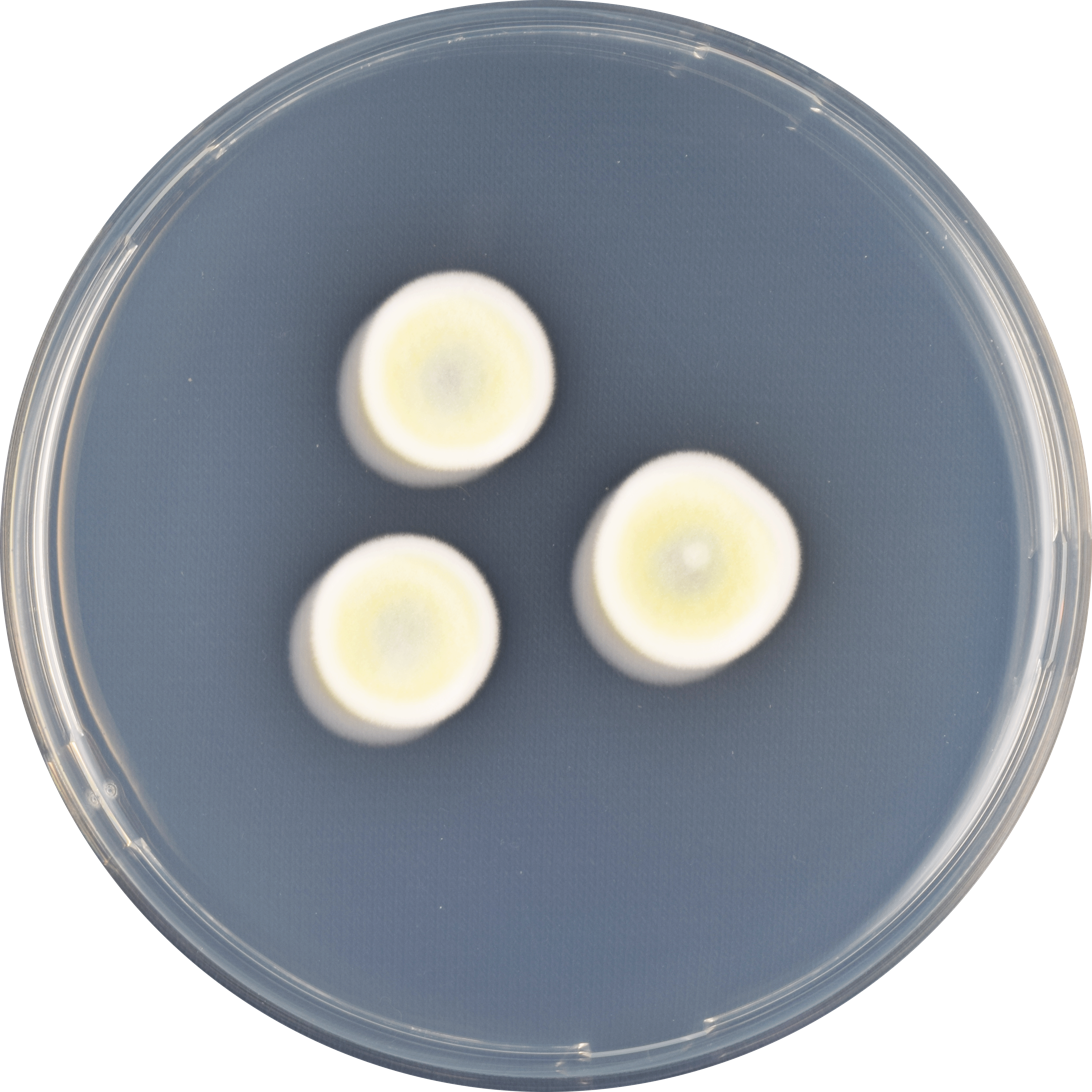
Aspergillus biplanus growing on CYA plate

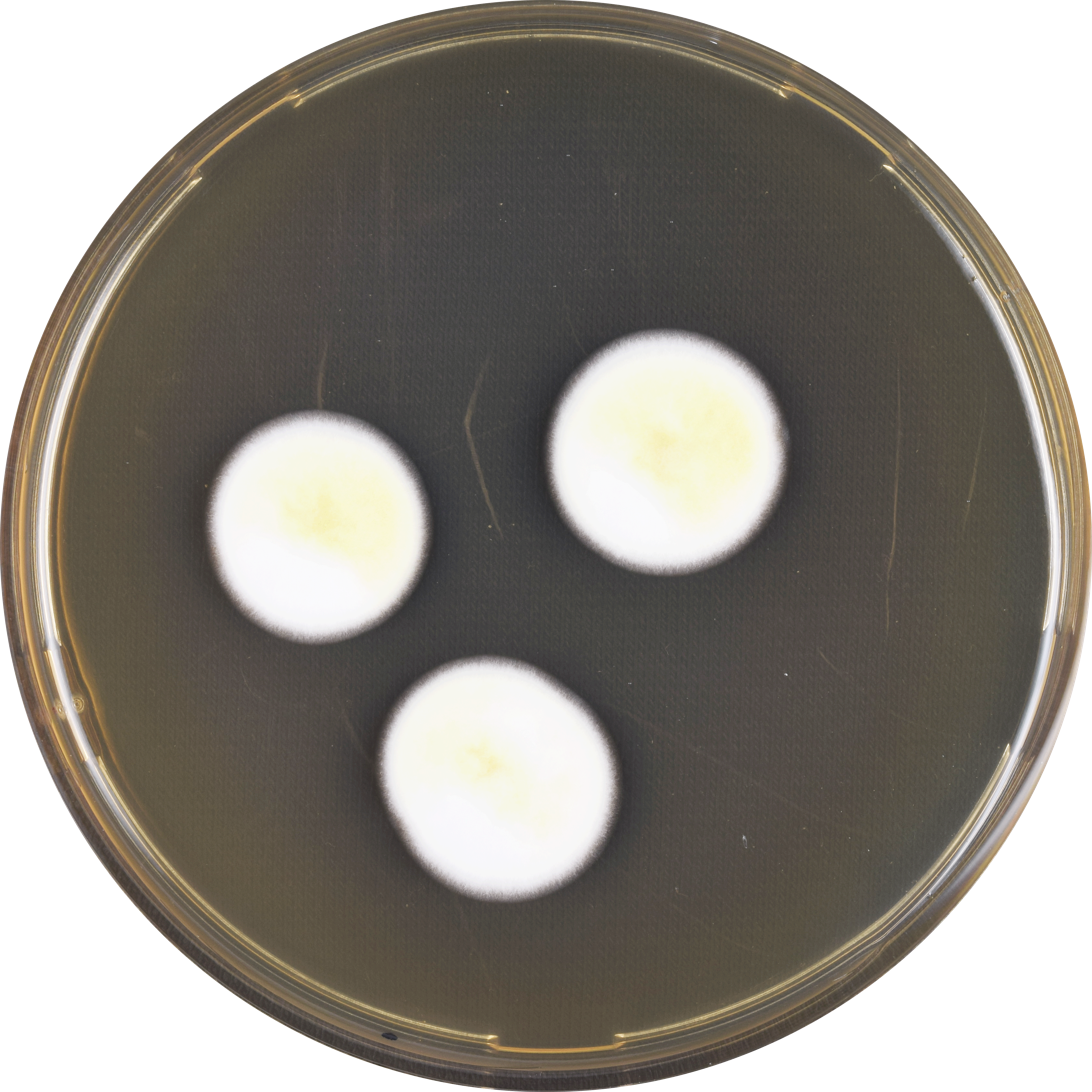
Aspergillus biplanus growing on MEAOX plate
