= Aspergillus amoenus =

Scientific classification
- Kingdom: Fungi
- Division: Ascomycota
- Class: Eurotiomycetes
- Order: Eurotiales
- Family: Aspergillaceae
- Genus: Aspergillus
- Species: A. amoenus

Binomial name
- Aspergillus amoenus M. Roberg (1930)

Species of fungus

Aspergillus amoenus is a species of fungus in the genus Aspergillus. It is from the Versicolores section. The species was first described in 1930.
