= Charles Thom =

American microbiologist and mycologist (1872–1956)

- Born: November 11, 1872; Minonk, Illinois, U.S.
- Died: May 24, 1956 (aged 83); Port Jefferson, New York, U.S.
- Resting place: Storrs, Connecticut
- Education: University of Missouri
- Known for: Biology of Aspergillus and Penicillium; Soil microbiology
- Scientific career
- Fields: Microbiology; mycology
- Doctoral advisor: Howard Ayers
- Author abbrev. (botany): Thom

Charles Thom (November 11, 1872 – May 24, 1956) was an American microbiologist and mycologist. Born and raised in Illinois, he received his PhD from the University of Missouri, the first such degree awarded by that institution. He studied the microbiology of dairy products and soil fungi, and in particular researched the genera Aspergillus and Penicillium. His work influenced the establishment of standards for food handling and processing in the USA. He pioneered the use of culture media to grow microorganisms, and, with food chemist James N. Currie, developed a process to mass-produce citric acid using Aspergillus. Thom played an important role in the development of penicillin in World War II.

== Early life ==
Thom was born in Minonk, Illinois in 1872, the fifth of six boys. His parents were Angus Sutherland Thom and Louisa (Herick) Thom, Scottish/Irish farmers who had settled in Illinois shortly before the American Civil War. Charles Thom was raised in a strongly religious household; his father was an elder in the Presbyterian church. Thom upheld Presbyterian values throughout his life, kept active in church affairs, and became a staunch prohibitionist. His early years spent working on his father's farm instilled the value of a strong work ethic, and first-hand knowledge of agricultural practices that would prove useful in his later career.

After graduating from high school, Thom attended Lake Forest Academy, a preparatory institution for college, in 1889. He earned a bachelor's degree from Lake Forest College in 1895. The next year he spent as a science teacher in a Danville high school, before returning to Lake Forest College to receive his Master's degree in 1897. In 1899, working under the supervision of Howard Ayers, he received his PhD from the University of Missouri on the topic of fertilization in the ferns Aspidium and Adiantum. This was the first doctorate awarded by that institution. Thom married Ethel Winifred Slater in 1906, with whom he had three children (one died during childbirth). Ethel Thom died in October 1942, shortly before his retirement. In 1944 he remarried, to Charlotte J. Bayles, with whom he lived until her death. Thom died two years after Charlotte at his home in Port Jefferson, New York, on May 24, 1956.

== Career ==
In 1902, Thom went to study with George F. Atkinson at Cornell University; two colleagues included Benjamin Duggar and Herbert Hice Whetzel, who both later became noted botanists. Two years later, he accepted a position as dairy mycologist, working with Herbert William Conn, in charge of "cheese investigations" at the Storrs Agricultural Experiment Station in Connecticut. He remained in this institution—a branch of the U.S. Department of Agriculture (USDA)— holding various research and administrative positions, until his retirement in 1942. During his employment there, Thom investigated the process of cheese ripening and sought to understand the composition of the microbiological flora required for imparting certain flavors on cheeses. Through this work he isolated and identified the fungi Penicillium camemberti and Penicillium roqueforti.

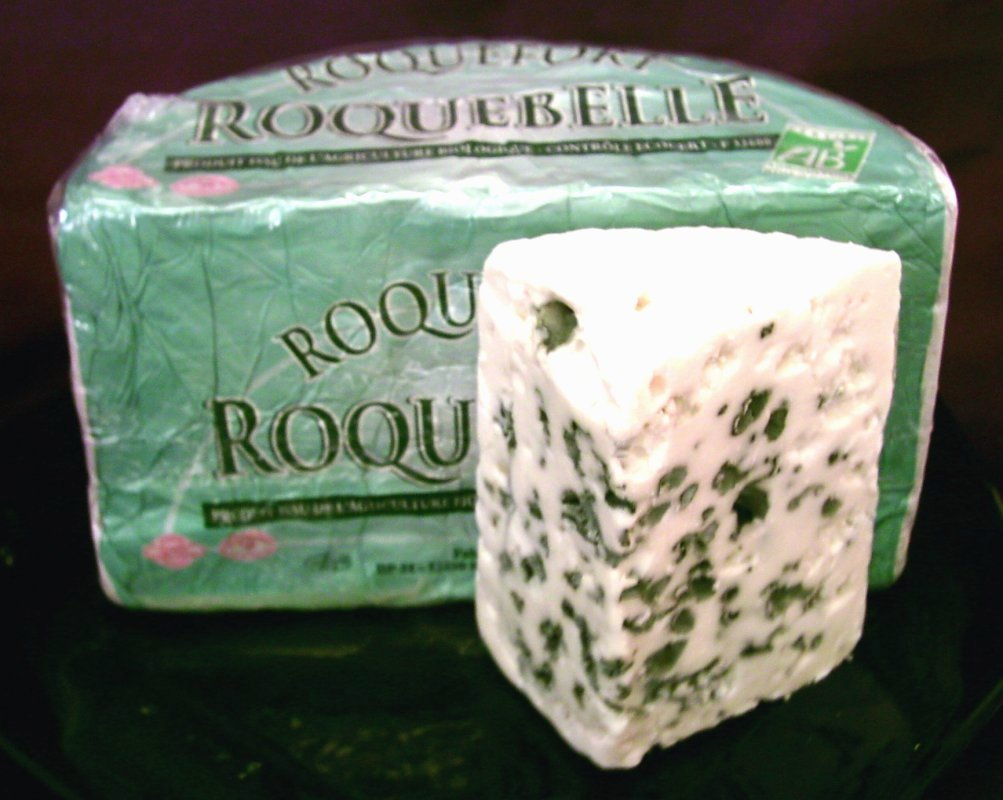
Thom identified the fungi responsible for imparting flavors to cheeses such as Roquefort.

In 1914, Thom became the Chief of the Microbiological Laboratory at the USDA Bureau of Chemistry, where his job was to study problems with the handling and processing of foods, and to enforce the Pure Food and Drug Act, a United States federal law that mandated federal inspection of food products. Known for his dedication to maintaining high standards in the food industry, he relished arguing court cases "in defense of sanitary practices in the handling and processing of perishable foods". In one noted case involving the adulteration of tomato catsup, he presented partially rotten tomatoes to the jury, and, concluding his testimony, asked them "Should the American people have to eat these in their catsup?"

Selman Waksman, who would later be another key contributor to antibiotic development, spent some months in 1915-1916 at the USDA in Washington, DC under Thom, studying soil fungi. Thom's work with the food chemist James N. Currie in 1916–17 enabled them to develop a process to mass-produce citric acid using Aspergillus, and a few years later, the first large-scale mold fermentation factory had been established in Brooklyn, New York. This early work ultimately led to the Department of Agriculture's establishing four Regional Research Laboratories in 1938 that were devoted to industrial mold fermentations.

During his time at the USDA, Thom became a world authority on the genera Aspergillus and Penicillium. Thom pioneered the technique of using defined, reproducible culture media to grow microorganisms; most of the taxa he described are still valid today. Together with Margaret B. Church, Thom maintained collections of fungus cultures for the American Type Culture Collection, established in 1925.

In 1929, a year after discovering penicillin, Alexander Fleming published a well-known paper in which he identified the mold Penicillium rubrum as the one responsible for creating the drug. Harold Raistrick succeeded in growing the organism on a simple culture medium, but could not isolate the penicillin produced by the mold when grown this way. With Thom's assistance, they identified the organism as Penicillium notatum and, in 1941, developed a method to scale up production at the Department of Agriculture's Northern Regional Research Laboratory in Peoria, Illinois, which ultimately resulted in an inexpensive supply of the drug. Fleming's mold was correctly identified as Penicillium rubens in 2011.

"During his active career in the Department of Agriculture [Thom] identified thousands of cultures for other investigators all around the world, taking little cognizance of the credit that he might or might not receive. He was a selfless and devoted scientist and public servant."

— Kenneth B. Raper

Thom held his job with the Bureau of Chemistry until 1927, when the position was abolished. He was then appointed Principal Mycologist of the Division of Soil Microbiology for the newly created Bureau of Chemistry and Soils. In a few years, Thom became known as an authority on soil microbiology, and was often invited to present papers at national and international meetings. In one of Thom's important contributions to the field, he led the research group responsible for advances that enabled the control of cotton root rot, which at the time was a major problem in the southwestern United States. In collaboration with his protégé Kenneth Raper, they published the Manual of Penicillin in 1940. Thom formally retired in 1942, although he remained active as a consultant and guest speaker until shortly before his death.

== Memberships and honors ==
Thom was the U.S. Delegate to the 1905 International Dairy Congress held in Paris, France. He helped establish a graduate education program at the USDA. In 1907, he became a charter member of the Dairy Association of America, and in 1918, was appointed President of the Bacteriological Association of Washington. He attended the 1935 International Soil Congress in Oxford, England and was Vice President of the 1939 International Microbiological Congress in New York. He was a member of the National Academy of Sciences, a charter member of the Mycological Society of America, and president of the Society of American Bacteriologists in 1940 and the Society of Industrial Microbiology in 1950. Thom was awarded an Honorary Doctor of Science degree by Lake Forest College in 1936. For his work on penicillin, he and his research group received the Lasker Group Award in 1946, and the USDA Distinguished Service Award in 1947. The same year, he received a gold medal from the Spanish National Research Council for his contributions to microbiology and medicine.

== Described taxa ==
- Aspergillus alliaceus Thom & Church 1926
- Aspergillus caespitosus Raper & Thom 1944
- Aspergillus foetidus Thom & Raper 1945
- Aspergillus fonsecaeus Thom & Raper 1965
- Aspergillus granulosus Raper & Thom 1944
- Aspergillus janus Raper & Thom 1944
- Aspergillus niveoglaucus Thom & Raper 1941
- Aspergillus panamensis Raper & Thom 1944
- Aspergillus quadrilineatus Thom & Raper 1939
- Aspergillus ruber Thom & Church 1926
- Aspergillus rugulosus Thom & Raper 1939
- Aspergillus schiemanniae Thom 1916
- Aspergillus sparsus Raper & Thom 1944
- Aspergillus terreus Thom 1918
- Aspergillus variecolor Thom & Raper 1939
- Eupenicillium gladioli L. McCulloch & Thom 1928
- Penicillium atramentosum Thom 1910
- Penicillium avellaneum Thom & Turesson 1915
- Penicillium biforme Thom 1910
- Penicillium brasiliense Thom 1930
- Penicillium camemberti Thom 1906
- Penicillium chrysogenum Thom 1910
- Penicillium citrinum Thom 1910
- Penicillium columnare Thom 1930
- Penicillium commune Thom 1910
- Penicillium crustosum Thom 1930
- Penicillium roqueforti Thom 1906
- Penicillium rugulosum Thom 1910

== Selected publications ==
- Thom, Charles (1906) "Fungi in cheese ripening; Camembert and Roquefort" in USDA Bureau of Animal Industry Bulletin 82 pp. 1–39
- Thom, Charles (1910) "Cultural studies of species of Penicillium" in USDA Bureau of Animal Industry Bulletin 118 pp. 1–109
- Thom, Charles; Currie, James N. (1916) "Aspergillus niger group" in Journal of Agricultural Research 7:1 pp. 1–15
- Thom, Charles; Church, Margaret B. (1918). "Aspergillus fumigatus, A. nidulans, A. terreus n. sp. and their allies". American Journal of Botany. 5 (2): 84–104. doi:10.2307/2435130. JSTOR 2435130.
- Thom, Charles; Church, Margaret B. (1921). "Aspergillus flavus, A. oryzae and associated species". American Journal of Botany. 8 (2): 103–126. doi:10.2307/2435149. JSTOR 2435149.
- Thom, Charles; Hunter, Albert Clayton (1924). "Hygienic Fundamentals of Food Handling" 228 pp.
- Thom, Charles; Church, Margaret B. (1926). "The Aspergilli". 272 pp.
- Thom, Charles (1930). "The Penicillia". 644 pp.
- Thom, Charles (1954). "The evolution of species concepts in Aspergillus and Penicillium". Annals of the New York Academy of Sciences. 60 (1): 24–34. Bibcode:1954NYASA..60...24T. doi:10.1111/j.1749-6632.1954.tb39995.x. PMID 13229217. S2CID 42412438.

== See also ==
- Category:Taxa named by Charles Thom
