= Hülle cell =

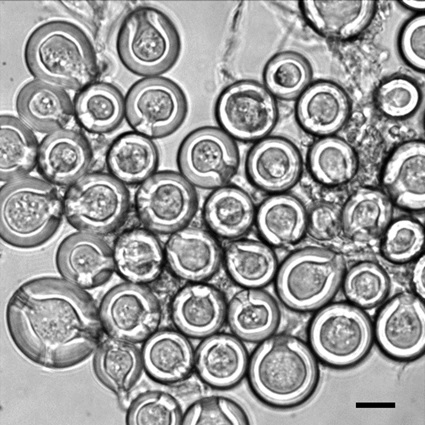
Hülle cells from a single cleistothecium. Scale bar is 10 μm

Eduard Eidam first described Hülle cells in 1883 where he termed Hülle cells as a "Blasenhülle" or bubble envelope (Eidam 1883). In different species, Hülle cell-like structures are known such as in Candida albicans which produce at the very end of the hyphae globose blisters named chlamydospores (Navarathna et al., 2016). Eidam suggested that Hülle cells originate from the tip of "secondary hyphae" which in turn emerge from "primary hyphae" and develop as a consequence of a swelling process. Hülle cells and the subtending hyphae are connected via two distinct types of septa. The inner one is a single perforate septum where woronin bodies can be observed and represents a typical ascomycetous septum. The second septum which separates Hülle cells from the subtending hyphae is unique and named basal septum. At the basal septum vesicle fusion is observable. Consequently, to this fusion so called lomasome-like accumulations are visible. These lomasome-like structures are membrane-invaginations. In Hülle cells several nuclei, mitochondria, lipid bodies and storage products can be observed (Ellis et al., 1973). During initial Hülle cell formation, it was shown that several nuclei fuse to form a marcronucleus (Carvalho et al., 2002). Different species of the genus Aspergillus produce Hülle cells, including Aspergillus nidulans and Aspergillus heterothallicus (Bayram and Braus 2012). Hülle cells have an average size of 12-20 μm, are of globose shape with an unusual thick cell wall and are mainly associated with the sexual developmental program. Hülle cells are known for all species in the section Nidulantes. In different species, Hülle cells vary in shape between the more elongated such as in Aspergillus ustus and the globose version like in Aspergillus nidulans. In Aspergillus nidulans and Aspergillus heterothallicus Hülle cells associate with the cleistothecia, whereas in Aspergillus protuberus and Aspergillus ustus Hülle cells are not in direct contact with the cleistothecia and are formed in masses (Muntanjola-Cvetkovic and Vukic).
