= Aspergillus panamensis =

Scientific classification
- Kingdom: Fungi
- Division: Ascomycota
- Class: Eurotiomycetes
- Order: Eurotiales
- Family: Aspergillaceae
- Genus: Aspergillus
- Species: A. panamensis

Binomial name
- Aspergillus panamensis Raper, K.B.; Thom, C. 1944

Type strain
- ATCC 16797, BCRC 33364, CBS 120.45, CCRC 33364, CGMCC 3.4464, FRR 1785, IMI 019393, IMI 019393ii, IMI 019393iii, LSHB A.61, LSHB A61, NCTC 6974, NRRL 1785, QM 6829, QM 8897, UAMH 9480, WB 1785

Species of fungus

Aspergillus panamensis is a species of fungus in the genus Aspergillus which produces cyclogregatin, gregatin A, gregatin B, gregatin C and gregatin D.
