= Penicillium paradoxum =

Scientific classification
- Kingdom: Fungi
- Division: Ascomycota
- Class: Eurotiomycetes
- Order: Eurotiales
- Family: Aspergillaceae
- Genus: Penicillium
- Species: P. paradoxum

Binomial name
- Penicillium paradoxum (Fennell & Raper) Samson, Houbraken, Visagie & Frisvad 2014

Species of fungus

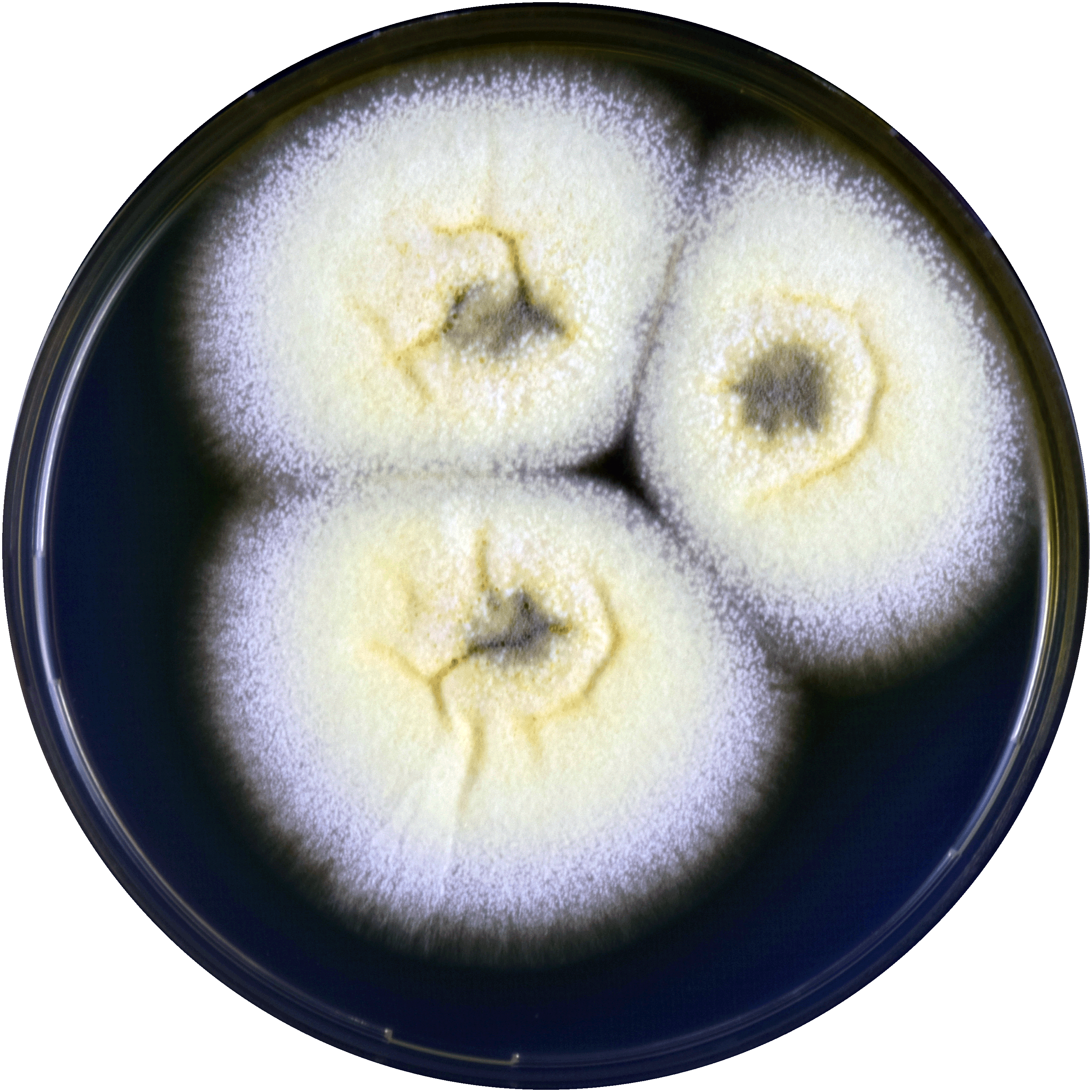
Aspergillus paradoxum

Penicillium paradoxum is a species of fungus in the genus Penicillium. Penicillium paradoxum grows on dog dung and is phototropic, and has a characteristic odour. Unusual for Penicillium, the fungus has an Aspergillus-like conidial head, not a penicillus.
