= Aspergillus foetidus =

Scientific classification
- Kingdom: Fungi
- Division: Ascomycota
- Class: Eurotiomycetes
- Order: Eurotiales
- Family: Aspergillaceae
- Genus: Aspergillus
- Species: A. foetidus

Binomial name
- Aspergillus foetidus Thom & Raper (1945)

Species of fungus

Aspergillus foetidus is a species of fungus in the genus Aspergillus.
