= C14H18O4 =

The molecular formula C_{14}H_{18}O_{4} (molar mass: 250.29 g/mol) may refer to:

- Cinoxate, an ingredient in some types of sunscreens
- Trolox, water-soluble derivative of vitamin E
- Gregatin B, a fungal metabolite
