= Aspergillus alliaceus =

Scientific classification
- Kingdom: Fungi
- Division: Ascomycota
- Class: Eurotiomycetes
- Order: Eurotiales
- Family: Aspergillaceae
- Genus: Aspergillus
- Species: A. alliaceus

Binomial name
- Aspergillus alliaceus Thom & Church (1926)

Species of fungus

Aspergillus alliaceus is a species of fungus in the genus Aspergillus. It is from the Flavi section. It was first described scientifically by Charles Thom and Margaret Church in 1926. Its associated teleomorph is Petromyces alliaceus. It has yellow spores.

== Growth and morphology ==
A. alliaceus has been cultivated on both Czapek yeast extract agar (CYA) plates and Malt Extract Agar Oxoid® (MEAOX) plates. The growth morphology of the colonies can be seen in the pictures below.

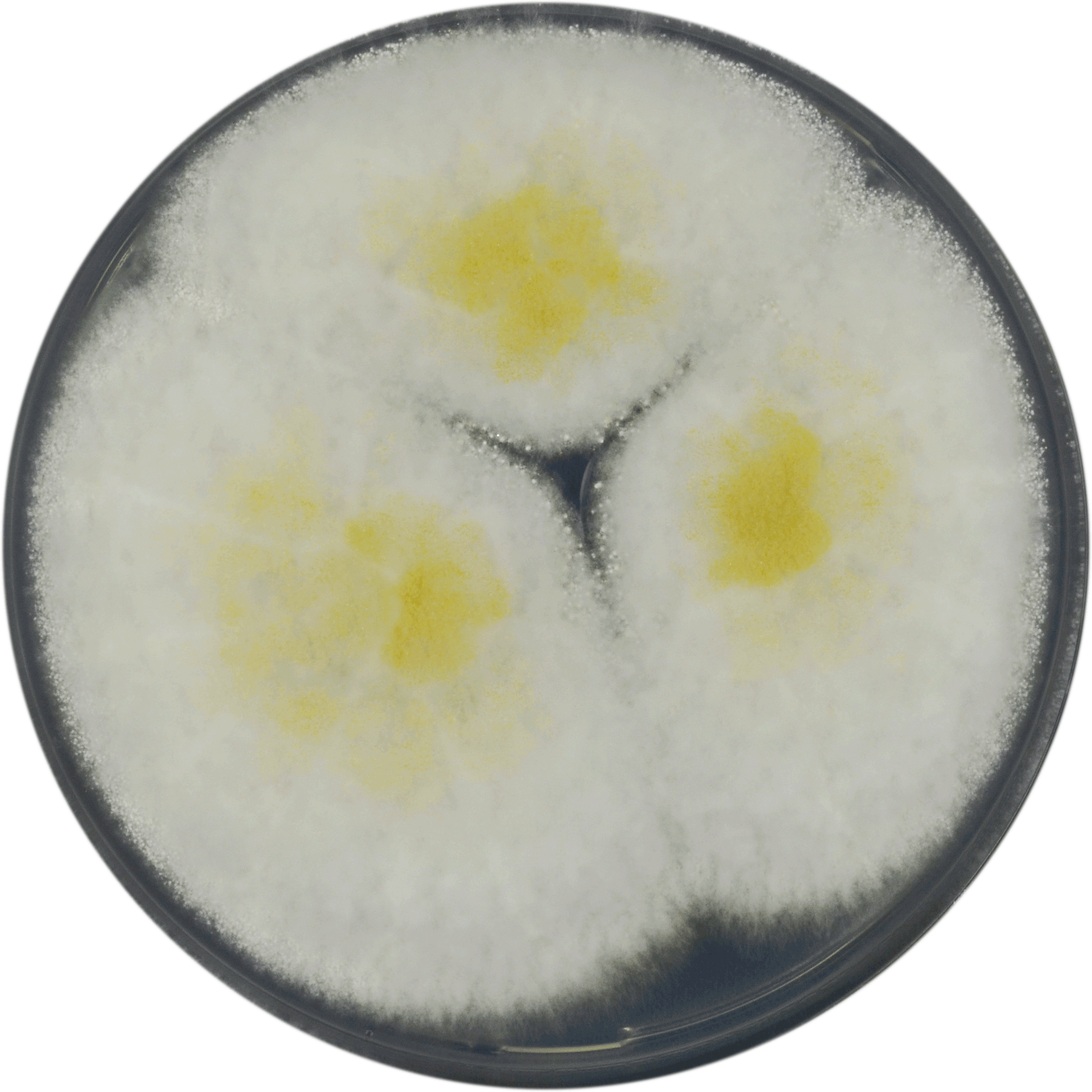
Aspergillus alliaceus growing on CYA plate

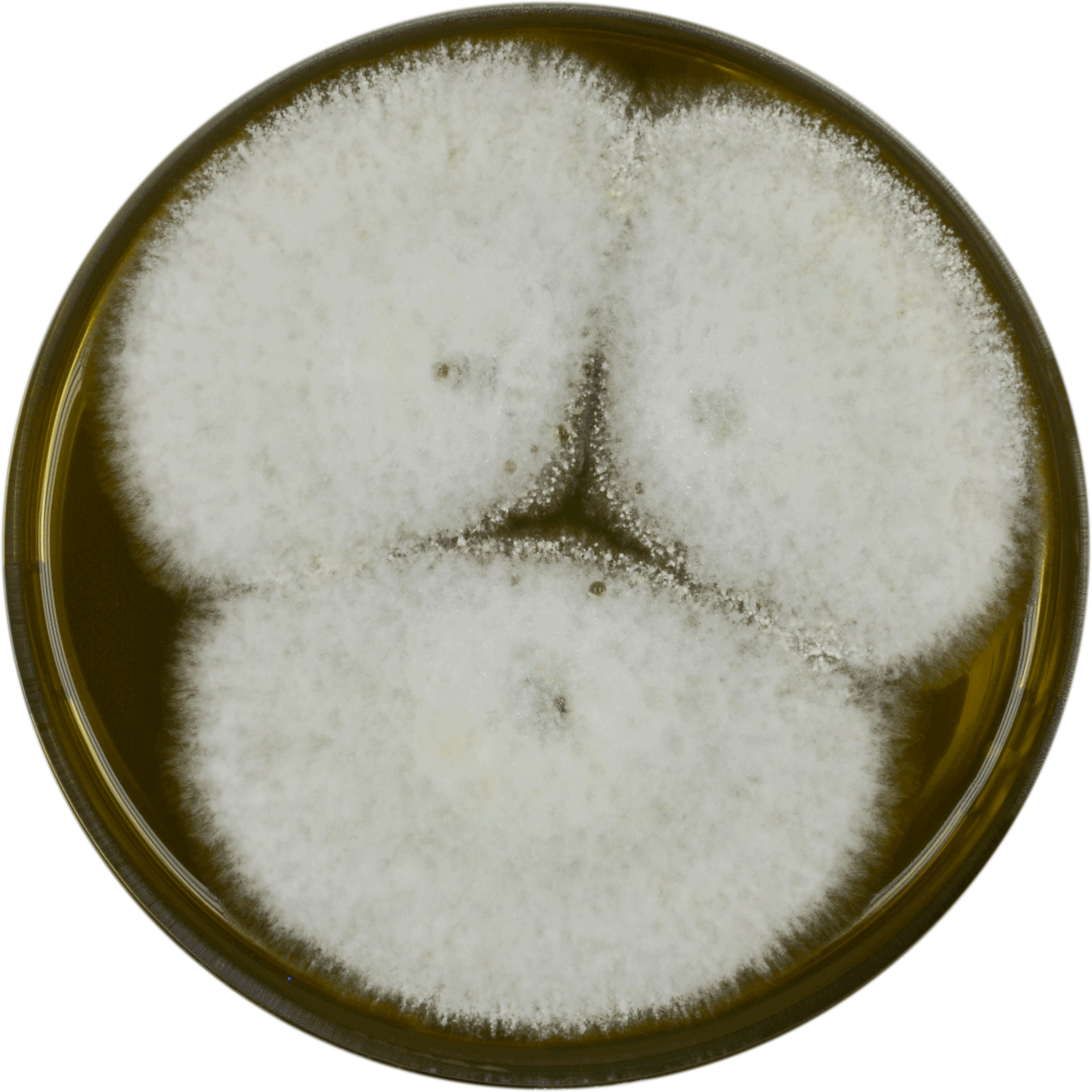
Aspergillus alliaceus growing on MEAOX plate
