= Aspergillus calidoustus =

Scientific classification
- Kingdom: Fungi
- Division: Ascomycota
- Class: Eurotiomycetes
- Order: Eurotiales
- Family: Aspergillaceae
- Genus: Aspergillus
- Species: A. calidoustus

Binomial name
- Aspergillus calidoustus Varga, Houbraken & Samson

Species of fungus

Aspergillus calidoustus is a species of fungus in the section Ustus, which grows at 37 °C (formerly called A. ustus, a species that fails to grow at 37 °C) and exhibits high minimal inhibitory concentrations to azoles. It is considered an agent of opportunistic infection.

== Laboratory identification ==
Colonies can appear white and progress to brownish-yellow. Curved conidiophores and Hülle cells can be identified. The conidia are echinulated (spiny).

== Survival in outer space ==
A. calidoustus has been found to survive conditions resembling the surface of Mars, which poses contamination risks for future missions.
