= Aspergillus caespitosus =

Scientific classification
- Kingdom: Fungi
- Division: Ascomycota
- Class: Eurotiomycetes
- Order: Eurotiales
- Family: Aspergillaceae
- Genus: Aspergillus
- Species: A. caespitosus

Binomial name
- Aspergillus caespitosus Raper & Thom (1944)

Species of fungus

Aspergillus caespitosus is a species of fungus in the genus Aspergillus. It was described scientifically in 1944 by Kenneth B. Raper and Charles Thom, who isolated it from soil. It is from the Nidulantes section.

== Growth and morphology ==
A. caespitosus has been cultivated on both Czapek yeast extract agar (CYA) plates and Malt Extract Agar Oxoid® (MEAOX) plates. The growth morphology of the colonies can be seen in the pictures below.

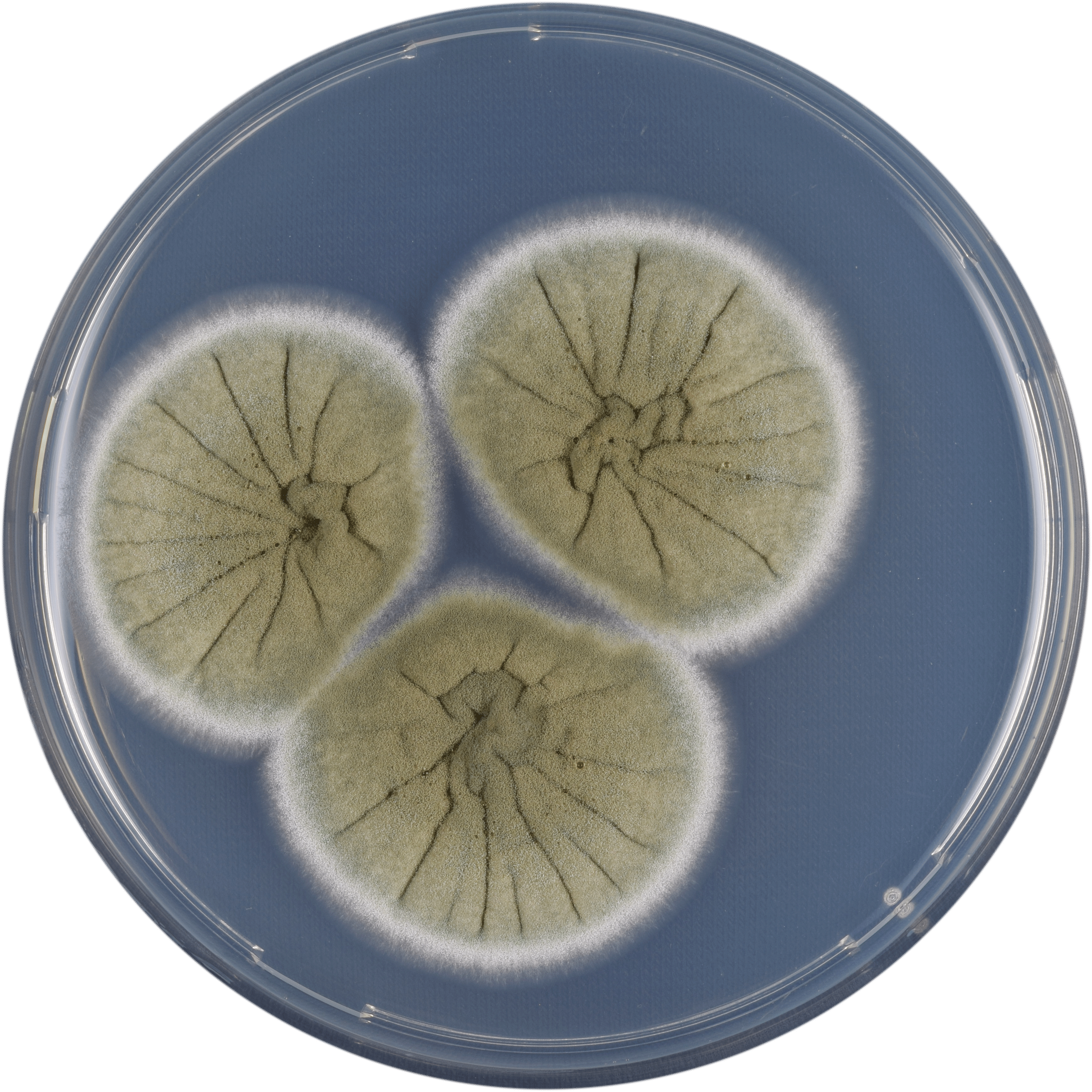
Aspergillus caespitosus growing on CYA plate

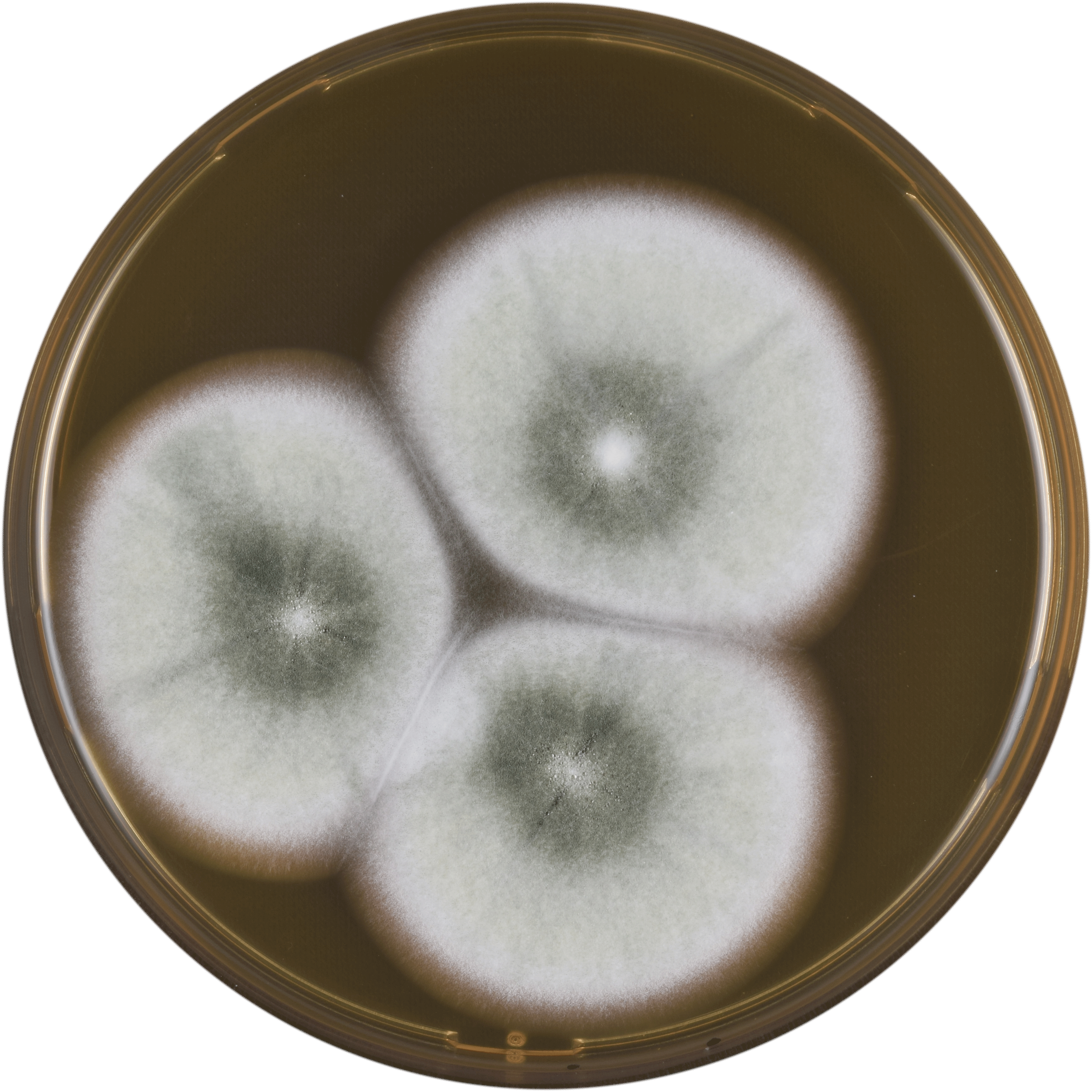
Aspergillus caespitosus growing on MEAOX plate
