= Penicillium rolfsii =

Scientific classification
- Kingdom: Fungi
- Division: Ascomycota
- Class: Eurotiomycetes
- Order: Eurotiales
- Family: Aspergillaceae
- Genus: Penicillium
- Species: P. rolfsii

Binomial name
- Penicillium rolfsii Thom, C. 1930

Type strain
- ATCC 10491, Biourge 36, CBS 368.48, FRR 1078, IFO 7735, IMI 040029, MUCL 29229, NBRC 7735, NRRL 1078, QM 1961, Thom 32

Species of fungus

Penicillium rolfsii is a species of fungus in the genus Penicillium which produces patulin.
