= Penicillium lapidosum =

Scientific classification
- Kingdom: Fungi
- Division: Ascomycota
- Class: Eurotiomycetes
- Order: Eurotiales
- Family: Aspergillaceae
- Genus: Penicillium
- Species: P. lapidosum

Binomial name
- Penicillium lapidosum Raper, K.B.; Fennell, D.I. 1948

Type strain
- ATCC 10462, Cameron 2, CBS 343.48, CCT 4477, FRR 0718, IFO 6100, IMI 039743, MUCL 38765, NBRC 6100, NRRL 718, QM 1928

Synonyms
- Eupenicillium lapidosum

Species of fungus

Penicillium lapidosum is an anamorph species of the genus of Penicillium which produces patulin.
