= Panola Township, Illinois =

Coordinates: 40°48′N 89°0′W

Panola Township
- Township
- Location in Woodford County
- Country: United States
- State: Illinois
- County: Woodford
- Established: November 7, 1854

Area
  - Total: 36.48 sq mi (94.5 km^{2})
  - Land: 36.44 sq mi (94.4 km^{2})
  - Water: 0.03 sq mi (0.078 km^{2}) 0.08%

Population (2020)
  - Estimate (2020): 375
  - Density: 9.7/sq mi (3.7/km^{2})
- Time zone: UTC-6 (CST)
  - Summer (DST): UTC-5 (CDT)
- FIPS code: 17-203-57537

Panola Township is located in Woodford County, Illinois at T27N, R2E. As of the 2020 census, its population was 375, and it contained 144 housing units. Panola Township and Minonk Township (T28N, R2E) were originally the same township, but formed two new townships on an unknown date.

== Geography ==
According to the 2010 census, the township has a total area of 36.48 square miles (94.5 km^{2}), of which 36.44 square miles (94.4 km^{2}) (or 99.89%) is land and 0.03 square miles (0.078 km^{2}) (or 0.08%) is water.

== Demographics ==
Historical population
Census	Pop.	Note	%±
2000	356		—
2010	353		−0.8%
2020	375		6.2%
U.S. Decennial Census

Racial-ethnic composition	2020	2010	2000
White (Non-Hispanic)	94.1%	95.8%	
Black or African American	0.27%	2.9%	
Asian	0%	0.3%	
Other	1.3%	0%	
