= Minonk Township, Illinois =

Coordinates: 40°53′N 89°0′W

Minonk Township
- Township
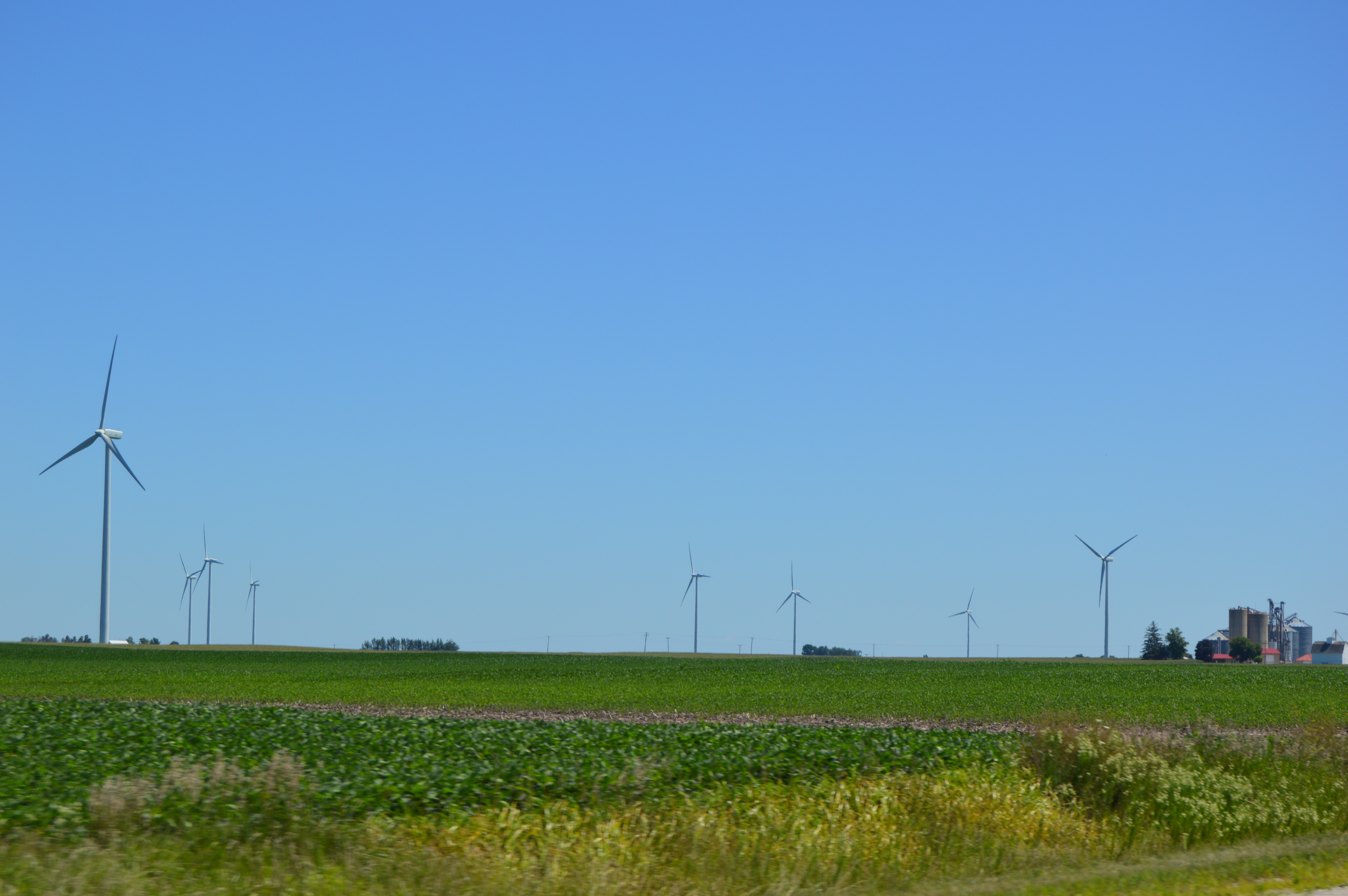
- Wind farm along Illinois Route 116

- Location in Woodford County
- Country: United States
- State: Illinois
- County: Woodford
- Established: Unknown

Area
  - Total: 36.69 sq mi (95.0 km^{2})
  - Land: 36.64 sq mi (94.9 km^{2})
  - Water: 0.05 sq mi (0.13 km^{2}) 0.14%

Population (2010)
  - Estimate (2016): 2,248
  - Density: 62.5/sq mi (24.1/km^{2})
- Time zone: UTC-6 (CST)
  - Summer (DST): UTC-5 (CDT)
- FIPS code: 17-203-49581

Minonk Township is located in Woodford County in Illinois at T28N, R2E. It includes within its boundaries the city of Minonk, Illinois. As of the 2010 census, its population was 2,292 and it contained 998 housing units. Minonk Township and Panola Township (T27N, R2E) were originally the same township, but were separated on an unknown date.

== Geography ==
According to the 2010 census, the township has a total area of 36.69 square miles (95.0 km^{2}), of which 36.64 square miles (94.9 km^{2}) (or 99.86%) is land and 0.05 square miles (0.13 km^{2}) (or 0.14%) is water.

== Demographics ==
Historical population
Census	Pop.	Note	%±
2016 (est.)	2,248
U.S. Decennial Census
