= Aspergillusene =

Group of chemical compounds

Aspergillusene A

Aspergillusene B

Aspergillusene C

Aspergillusenes are a group of chemical compounds first isolated from a strain of sea fan-derived fungus Aspergillus sydowii. They are sesquiterpenes of the bisabolane-type.

A laboratory synthesis of aspergillusene B was reported in 2020.
