= Minonk, Illinois =

Minonk
- City
- Motto: a "Good Place" to Live
- Location of Minonk in Woodford County, Illinois
- Coordinates: 40°54′37″N 89°02′17″W
- Country: United States
- State: Illinois
- County: Woodford
- Founded: 1854

Government
  - Mayor: Russell Ruestman

Area
  - Total: 2.40 sq mi (6.22 km^{2})
  - Land: 2.40 sq mi (6.22 km^{2})
  - Water: 0 sq mi (0.00 km^{2})
- Elevation: 735 ft (224 m)

Population (2020)
  - Total: 1,928
  - Estimate (2024): 1,898
  - Density: 803.4/sq mi (310.21/km^{2})
- Time zone: UTC-6 (CST)
  - Summer (DST): UTC-5 (CDT)
- ZIP code: 61760
- Area code: 309
- FIPS code: 17-49568
- GNIS feature ID: 2395353
- Website: cityofminonk.com

Minonk is a city in Minonk Township, Woodford County, Illinois. As of the 2020 census, Minonk had a population of 1,928. The city is part of the Peoria, Illinois, metropolitan area.

== History ==
The founding of Minonk corresponds with the construction of the Illinois Central Railroad. The Illinois Central Railroad main line was completed in 1854 and ran through Section Seven, eventually becoming the City of Minonk. The plat of the town was first recorded on November 7, 1854. The Pekin line of the Santa Fe Railroad, constructed in 1879, intersected with the Illinois Central Railroad in the city.

David Neal, an agent with the Illinois Central Railroad, is credited for naming the city. Local folklore provides varying accounts about the origins of the name “Minonk.” One version states that he originally named the area after a street in Boston, taken from the Mohican word meaning "high point," where he owned property. A second story suggests that he changed the name of the settlement, originally referred to as “Marquette” on old French maps, to the Ojibwe word “Minonk,” meaning “a good place.” Minonk is the only city in the world with that name.

Early settlers were attracted to Minonk by a variety of livelihoods. Many came to work on the railroad. Others settled in the area to farm on the abundant, rich farmland. However, coal mining was the leading industry in the early years of Minonk. The first coal mines were developed in the 1860s, and at one point employed over 300 men. Two mines operated in Minonk: the first mine was located on the north edge of the city, and the second was situated a half-mile north of town.

== Geography ==
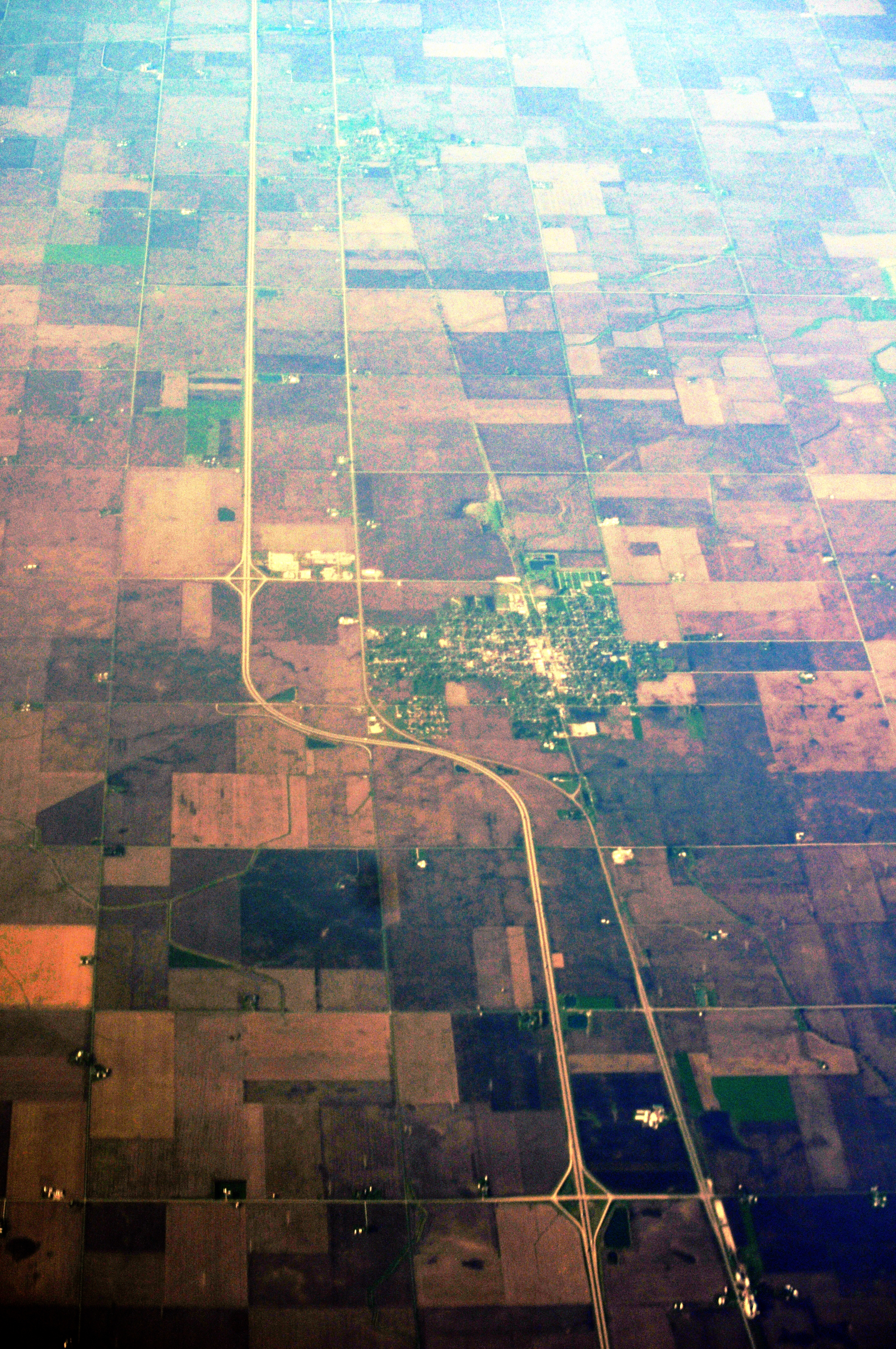
Aerial view of Minonk and nearby Interstate 39 in 2012

As of the 2010 census, Minonk has a total area of 2.42 square miles (6.27 km^{2}), all land.

=== Climate ===
Climate data for Minonk, Illinois (1991–2020 normals, extremes 1896–present)
Month	Jan	Feb	Mar	Apr	May	Jun	Jul	Aug	Sep	Oct	Nov	Dec	Year
Record high °F (°C)	69 (21)	74 (23)	88 (31)	93 (34)	103 (39)	105 (41)	111 (44)	105 (41)	104 (40)	93 (34)	82 (28)	71 (22)	111 (44)
Mean daily maximum °F (°C)	32.8 (0.4)	37.5 (3.1)	49.6 (9.8)	62.7 (17.1)	74.2 (23.4)	83.1 (28.4)	86.1 (30.1)	84.3 (29.1)	79.0 (26.1)	66.0 (18.9)	50.6 (10.3)	38.1 (3.4)	62.0 (16.7)
Daily mean °F (°C)	24.0 (−4.4)	28.1 (−2.2)	39.1 (3.9)	50.7 (10.4)	62.5 (16.9)	71.8 (22.1)	75.0 (23.9)	73.0 (22.8)	66.4 (19.1)	54.0 (12.2)	40.8 (4.9)	29.6 (−1.3)	51.2 (10.7)
Mean daily minimum °F (°C)	15.2 (−9.3)	18.8 (−7.3)	28.6 (−1.9)	38.8 (3.8)	50.8 (10.4)	60.6 (15.9)	63.9 (17.7)	61.7 (16.5)	53.7 (12.1)	42.0 (5.6)	31.0 (−0.6)	21.1 (−6.1)	40.5 (4.7)
Record low °F (°C)	−25 (−32)	−28 (−33)	−14 (−26)	6 (−14)	24 (−4)	36 (2)	42 (6)	38 (3)	22 (−6)	10 (−12)	−9 (−23)	−24 (−31)	−28 (−33)
Average precipitation inches (mm)	1.99 (51)	1.84 (47)	2.51 (64)	3.66 (93)	4.60 (117)	3.98 (101)	3.82 (97)	3.48 (88)	3.87 (98)	3.08 (78)	2.61 (66)	2.21 (56)	37.65 (956)
Average snowfall inches (cm)	5.9 (15)	5.2 (13)	3.2 (8.1)	0.8 (2.0)	0.0 (0.0)	0.0 (0.0)	0.0 (0.0)	0.0 (0.0)	0.0 (0.0)	0.0 (0.0)	1.1 (2.8)	5.5 (14)	21.7 (55)
Average precipitation days (≥ 0.01 in)	8.8	7.6	9.4	11.7	12.7	10.3	9.2	9.1	8.1	9.6	9.2	8.4	114.1
Average snowy days (≥ 0.1 in)	4.6	3.6	1.6	0.3	0.0	0.0	0.0	0.0	0.0	0.0	1.1	3.7	14.9
Source: NOAA

== Demographics ==
Historical population
Census	Pop.	Note	%±
1870	1,122		—
1880	1,913		70.5%
1890	2,316		21.1%
1900	2,545		9.9%
1910	2,070		−18.7%
1920	2,109		1.9%
1930	1,910		−9.4%
1940	1,897		−0.7%
1950	1,955		3.1%
1960	2,001		2.4%
1970	2,267		13.3%
1980	2,039		−10.1%
1990	1,982		−2.8%
2000	2,168		9.4%
2010	2,078		−4.2%
2020	1,928		−7.2%
U.S. Decennial Census

=== 2020 census ===
As of the 2020 census, Minonk had a population of 1,928. The median age was 44.2 years. 20.1% of residents were under the age of 18 and 20.5% of residents were 65 years of age or older. For every 100 females there were 101.9 males, and for every 100 females age 18 and over there were 98.6 males age 18 and over.

0.0% of residents lived in urban areas, while 100.0% lived in rural areas.

There were 824 households in Minonk, of which 25.8% had children under the age of 18 living in them. Of all households, 49.9% were married-couple households, 19.5% were households with a male householder and no spouse or partner present, and 23.9% were households with a female householder and no spouse or partner present. About 30.8% of all households were made up of individuals and 15.1% had someone living alone who was 65 years of age or older.

There were 892 housing units, of which 7.6% were vacant. The homeowner vacancy rate was 3.0% and the rental vacancy rate was 1.4%.

Racial composition as of the 2020 census
Race	Number	Percent
White	1,836	95.2%
Black or African American	12	0.6%
American Indian and Alaska Native	3	0.2%
Asian	0	0.0%
Native Hawaiian and Other Pacific Islander	0	0.0%
Some other race	10	0.5%
Two or more races	67	3.5%
Hispanic or Latino (of any race)	19	1.0%

=== 2000 census ===
At the 2000 census, there were 2,168 people, 841 households and 587 families residing in the city. The population density was 1,587.6 inhabitants per square mile (613.0/km^{2}). There were 885 housing units at an average density of 648.1 units per square mile (250.2 units/km^{2}). The racial makeup of the city was 98.99% White, 0.05% African American, 0.05% Asian, 0.28% from other races, and 0.65% from two or more races. Hispanic or Latino of any race were 1.20% of the population.

There were 841 households, of which 31.9% had children under the age of 18 living with them, 57.9% were married couples living together, 9.2% had a female householder with no husband present, and 30.2% were non-families. 26.8% of all households were made up of individuals, and 15.6% had someone living alone who was 65 years of age or older. The average household size was 2.50 and the average family size was 3.02.

25.9% of the population were under the age of 18, 6.9% from 18 to 24, 27.5% from 25 to 44, 19.0% from 45 to 64, and 20.8% who were 65 years of age or older. The median age was 39 years. For every 100 females, there were 91.4 males. For every 100 females age 18 and over, there were 86.0 males.

The median household income was $44,028 and the median family income was $50,379. Males had a median income of $35,859 compared with $22,500 for females. The per capita income for the city was $17,688. About 7.0% of families and 8.6% of the population were below the poverty line, including 12.9% of those under age 18 and 7.7% of those age 65 or over.

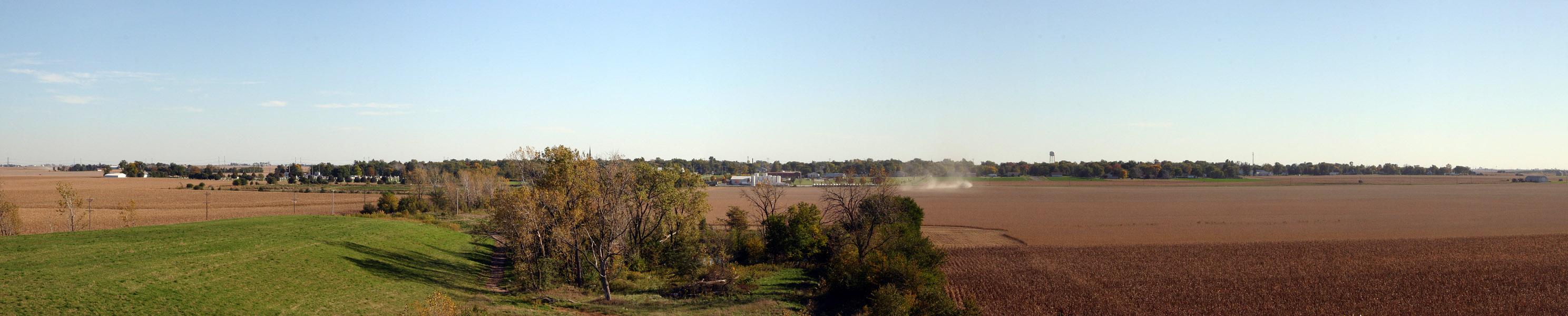
Panorama of Minonk from the north during harvest 2006

== Education ==
It is in the Fieldcrest Community Unit School District 6.

Minonk is home to Fieldcrest High School and their football team, the Fieldcrest Knights.
