= Aspergillus sparsus =

Scientific classification
- Kingdom: Fungi
- Division: Ascomycota
- Class: Eurotiomycetes
- Order: Eurotiales
- Family: Aspergillaceae
- Genus: Aspergillus
- Species: A. sparsus

Binomial name
- Aspergillus sparsus Raper & Thom (1944)

Species of fungus

Aspergillus sparsus is a species of fungus in the genus Aspergillus. It is from the Sparsi section. The species was first described in 1944. It has been isolated from soil in Costa Rica and the United States.

== Growth and morphology ==
A. sparsus has been cultivated on both Czapek yeast extract agar (CYA) plates and Malt Extract Agar Oxoid® (MEAOX) plates. The growth morphology of the colonies can be seen in the pictures below.

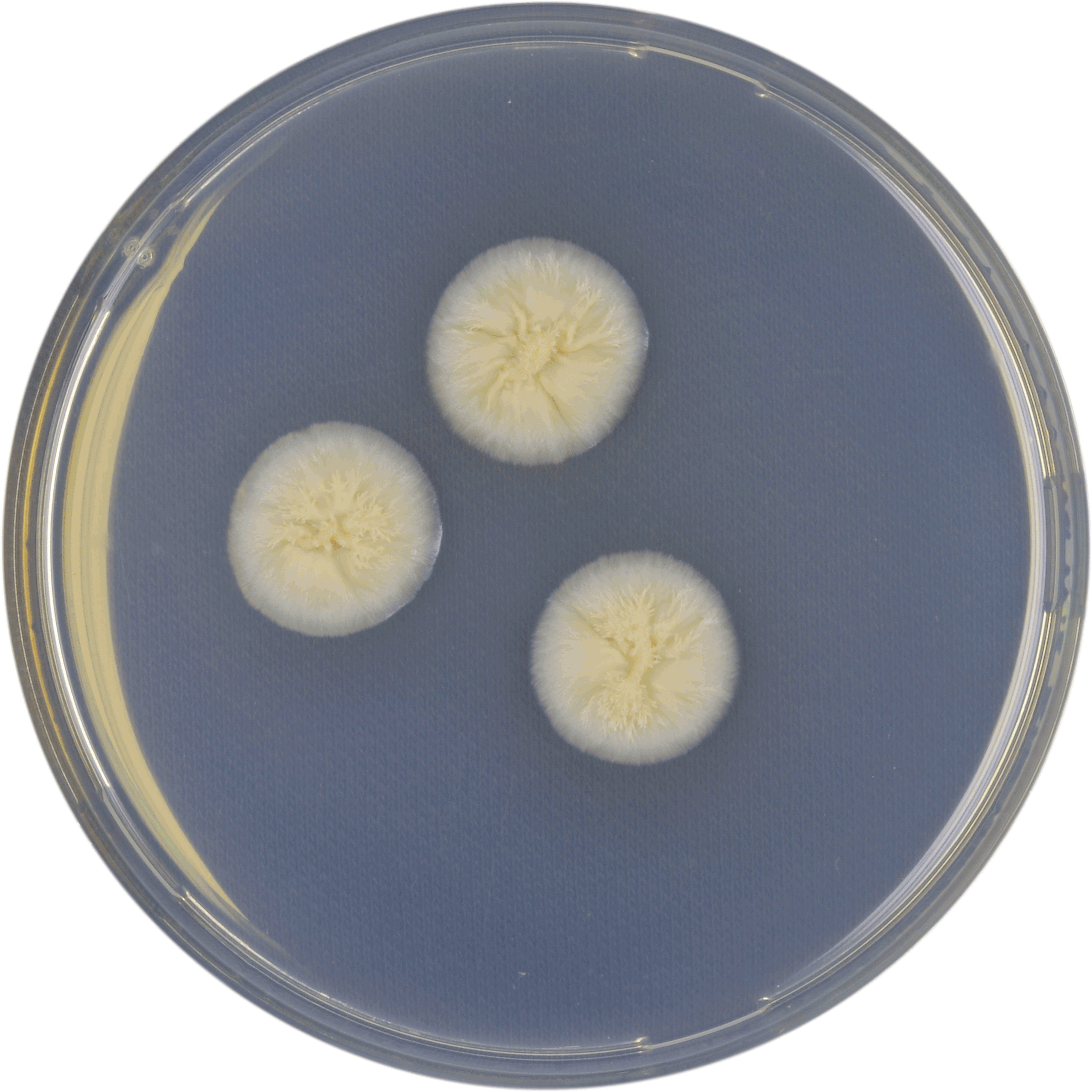
Aspergillus sparsus growing on CYA plate

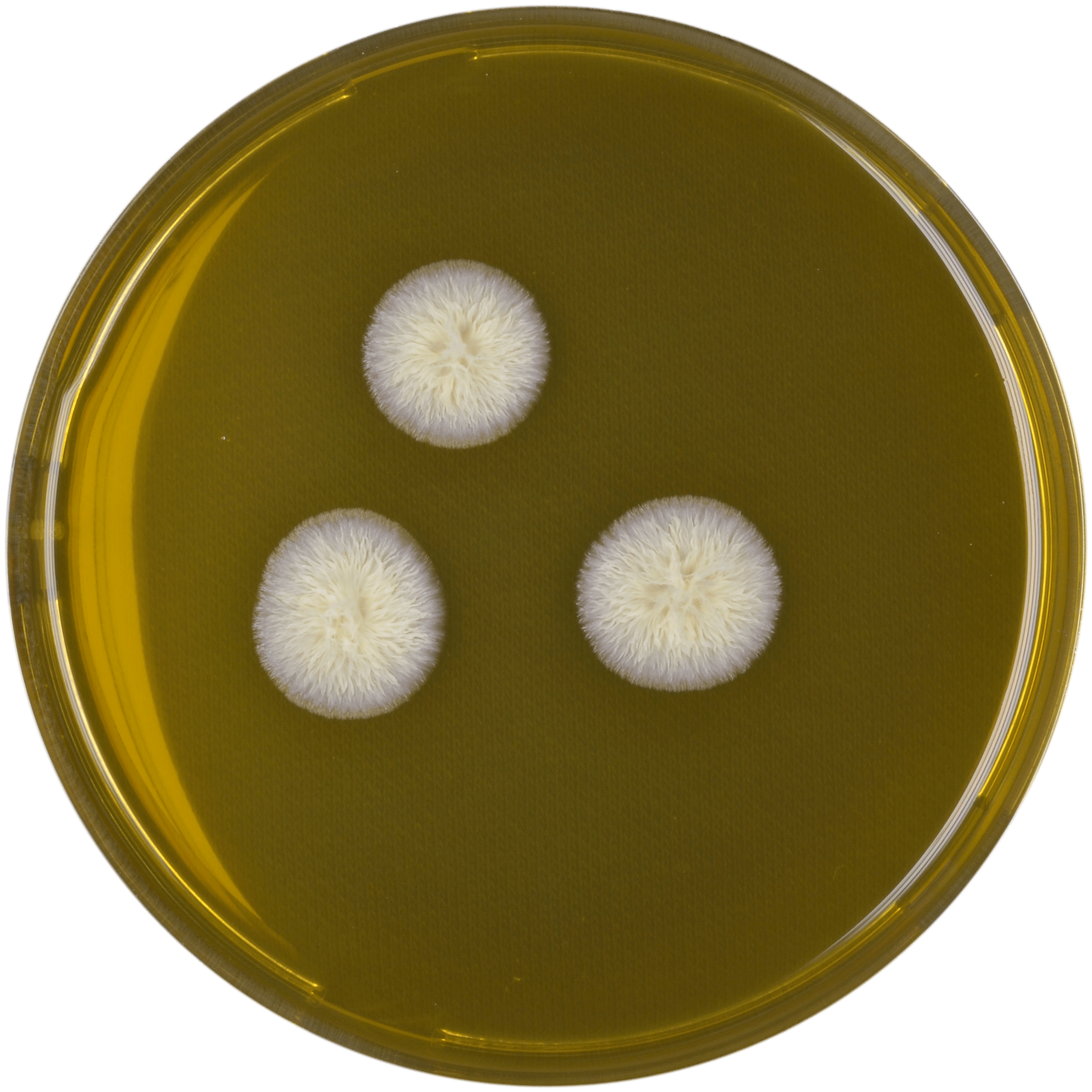
Aspergillus sparsus growing on MEAOX plate
