= Aspergillus quadrilineatus =

Scientific classification
- Kingdom: Fungi
- Division: Ascomycota
- Class: Eurotiomycetes
- Order: Eurotiales
- Family: Aspergillaceae
- Genus: Aspergillus
- Species: A. quadrilineatus

Binomial name
- Aspergillus quadrilineatus Thom & Raper (1939)

Synonyms
- Aspergillus tetrazonus and Aspergillus acristatulus

Species of fungus

Aspergillus quadrilineatus is a species of fungus in the genus Aspergillus. It is from the Nidulantes section. The species was first described in 1939. It has been isolated from soil in New Jersey, Egypt, Spain, China, and Namibia. It has been reported to produce asperthecin, averufin, 7-methoxyaverufin, sterigmatocystin, versicolourin, desferritriacetylfusigen, echinocandin B & E, variacoxanthone B, emestrin, aurantioemestrin, dethiosecoemestrin, emindol DA, microperfuranone, penicillin G, quadrilineatin, and sterigmatocystin.

== Growth and morphology ==
A. quadrilineatus has been cultivated on both Czapek yeast extract agar (CYA) plates and Malt Extract Agar Oxoid® (MEAOX) plates. The growth morphology of the colonies can be seen in the pictures below.

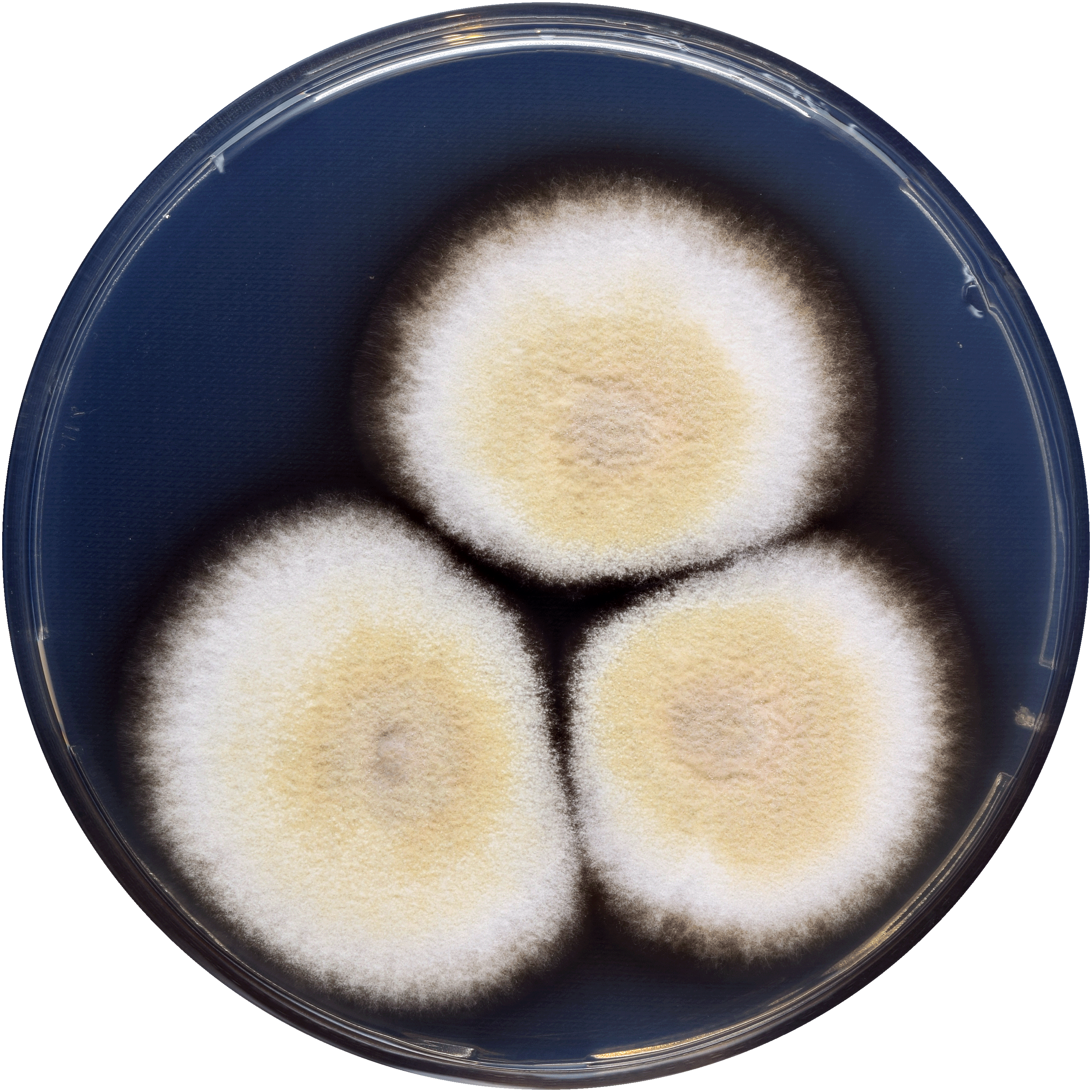
Aspergillus quadrilineatus growing on CYA plate

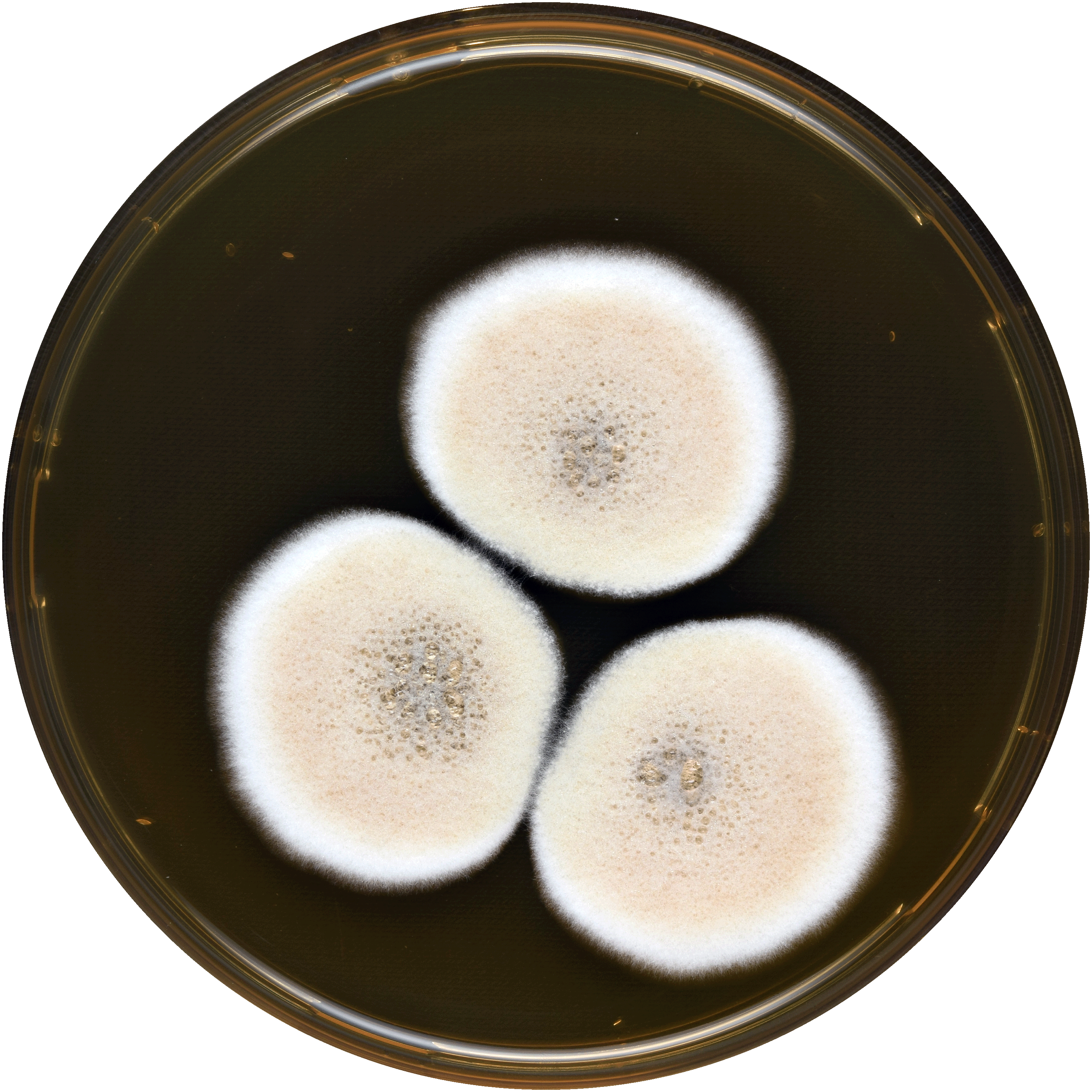
Aspergillus quadrilineatus growing on MEAOX plate
