= Aspergillus puniceus =

Scientific classification
- Kingdom: Fungi
- Division: Ascomycota
- Class: Eurotiomycetes
- Order: Eurotiales
- Family: Aspergillaceae
- Genus: Aspergillus
- Species: A. puniceus

Binomial name
- Aspergillus puniceus Kwon-Chung & Fennell (1965)

Species of fungus

Aspergillus puniceus is a species of fungus in the genus Aspergillus. It is from the Usti section. The species was first described in 1965.

== Growth and morphology ==
A. puniceus has been cultivated on both Czapek yeast extract agar (CYA) plates and Malt Extract Agar Oxoid® (MEAOX) plates. The growth morphology of the colonies can be seen in the pictures below.

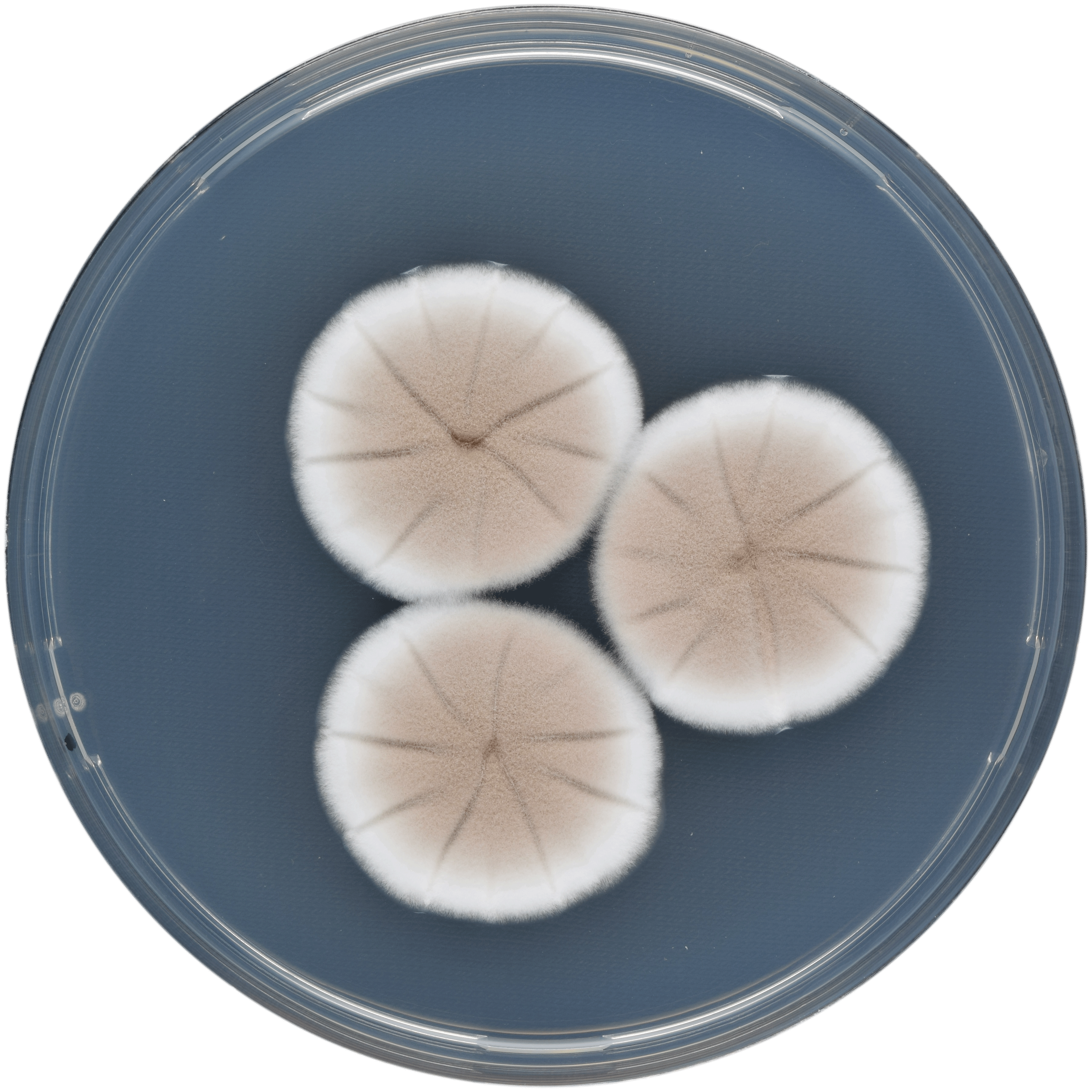
Aspergillus puniceus growing on CYA plate

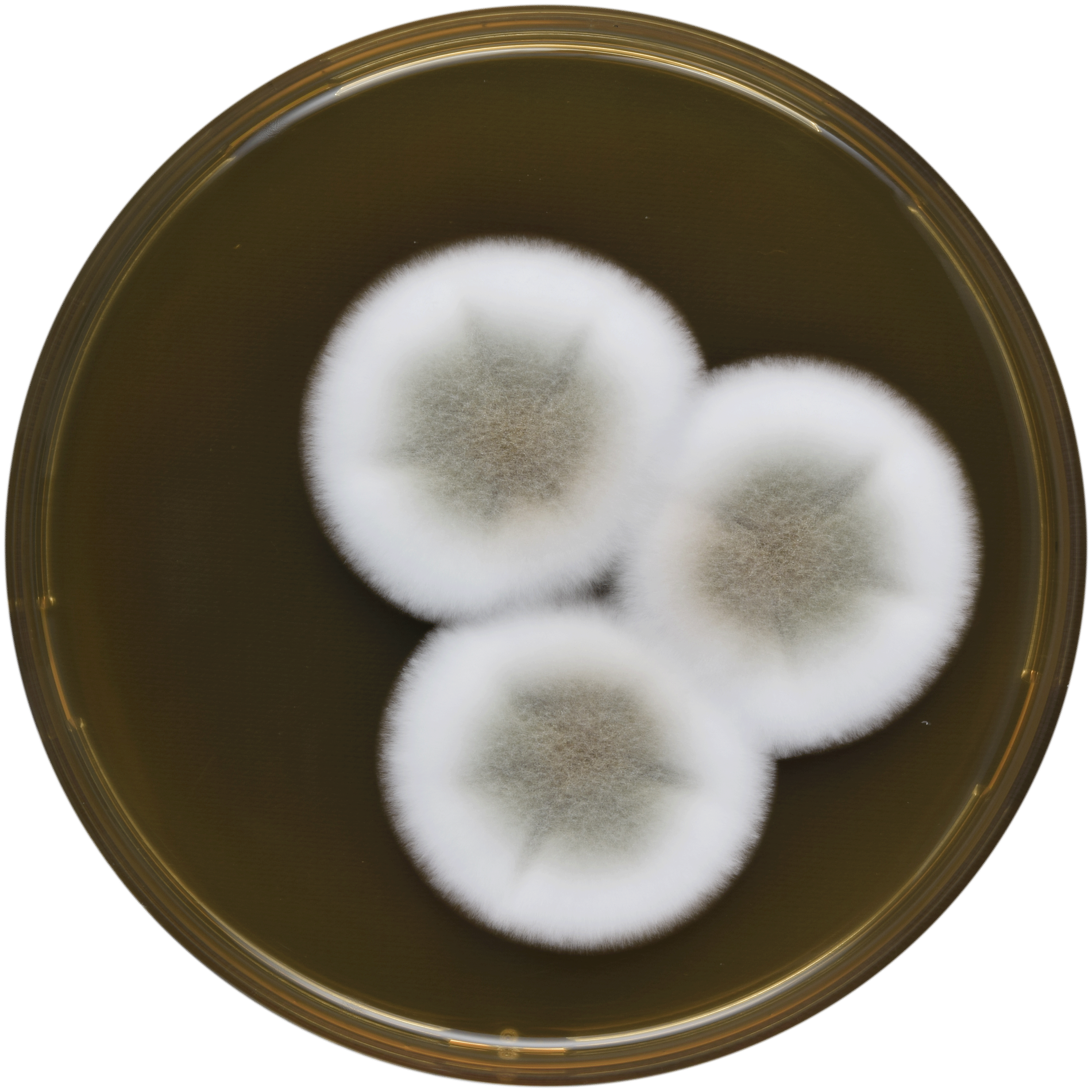
Aspergillus puniceus growing on MEAOX plate
