= Penicillium atramentosum =

Scientific classification
- Kingdom: Fungi
- Division: Ascomycota
- Class: Eurotiomycetes
- Order: Eurotiales
- Family: Aspergillaceae
- Genus: Penicillium
- Species: P. atramentosum

Binomial name
- Penicillium atramentosum Thom, C. 1910

Type strain
- ATCC 10104, BCRC 32370, Biourge 161, CBS 291.48, CCRC 31550, CCRC 32370, CMI 39752, FRR 0795, IBT 6616, IFO 8137, IHEM 5934, IMI 039725, IMI 039752, IMI 039752ii, IMI 359752ii, JCM 9930, KCTC 6250, LSHB P-1, MUCL 29071, MUCL 29126, NBRC 8137, NRRL 795, NRRL 797, QM 7483, Thom 38, Thom 4733, Thom 4733.3, Thom B161

Synonyms
- Penicillium atramentosuma

Species of fungus

Penicillium atramentosum is a fungus species of the genus of Penicillium which produces tannase.

== See also ==
- List of Penicillium species
