= Aspergillus niveoglaucus =

Scientific classification
- Kingdom: Fungi
- Division: Ascomycota
- Class: Eurotiomycetes
- Order: Eurotiales
- Family: Aspergillaceae
- Genus: Aspergillus
- Species: A. niveoglaucus

Binomial name
- Aspergillus niveoglaucus Thom & Raper (1941)

Species of fungus

Aspergillus niveoglaucus is a species of fungus in the genus Aspergillus. It is from the Aspergillus section. The species was first described in 1941. It has been reported to produce asperflavin, auroglaucin, bisanthrons, dihydroauroglaucin, echinulins, emodin, erythroglaucin, flavoglaucin, mycophenolic acid (tentatively identified), neoechinulins, physcion, questin, questinol, siderin, tetracyclic, and tetrahydroauroglaucin.
