= Aspergillus ruber =

Scientific classification
- Kingdom: Fungi
- Division: Ascomycota
- Class: Eurotiomycetes
- Order: Eurotiales
- Family: Aspergillaceae
- Genus: Aspergillus
- Species: A. ruber

Binomial name
- Aspergillus ruber Thom & Church (1929)

Species of fungus

Aspergillus ruber is a species of fungus in the genus Aspergillus. It is from the Aspergillus section. The species was first described in 1929. It has been isolated from coffee beans in the UK, tea and soil in China, and malt dust in the Czech Republic. It has been reported to produce auroglaucin, bisanthrons, catenarin, dihydroauroglaucin, echinulins, epiheveadrides, erythroglaucin, flavoglaucin, isoechinulins, neoechinulins, physcion, questin, questinol, tetracyclic, and tetrahydroauroglaucin.
