= Aspergillus heterothallicus =

Scientific classification
- Kingdom: Fungi
- Division: Ascomycota
- Class: Eurotiomycetes
- Order: Eurotiales
- Family: Aspergillaceae
- Genus: Aspergillus
- Species: A. heterothallicus

Binomial name
- Aspergillus heterothallicus Kwon-Chung, Fennell & Raper (1965)

Species of fungus

Aspergillus heterothallicus is a species of fungus in the genus Aspergillus. It is from the Usti section. The species was first described in 1965. It has been reported to produce emethallicins, emeheterone, emesterones A & B, 5’-hydroxyaveranthin, stellatin, and sterigmatocystin.

== Growth and morphology ==
A. heterothallicus has been cultivated on both Czapek yeast extract agar (CYA) plates and Malt Extract Agar Oxoid® (MEAOX) plates. The growth morphology of the colonies can be seen in the pictures below.

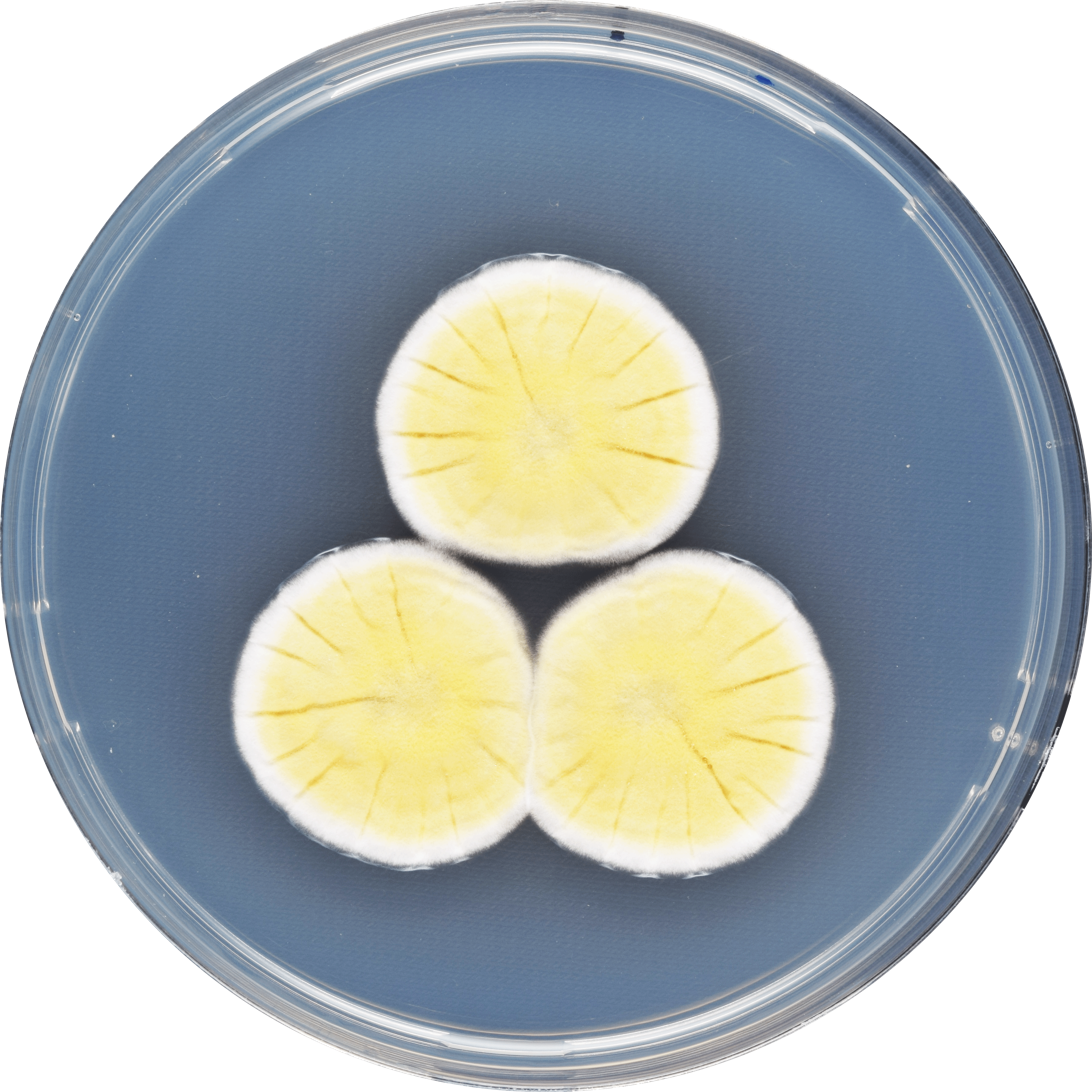
Aspergillus heterothallicus growing on CYA plate

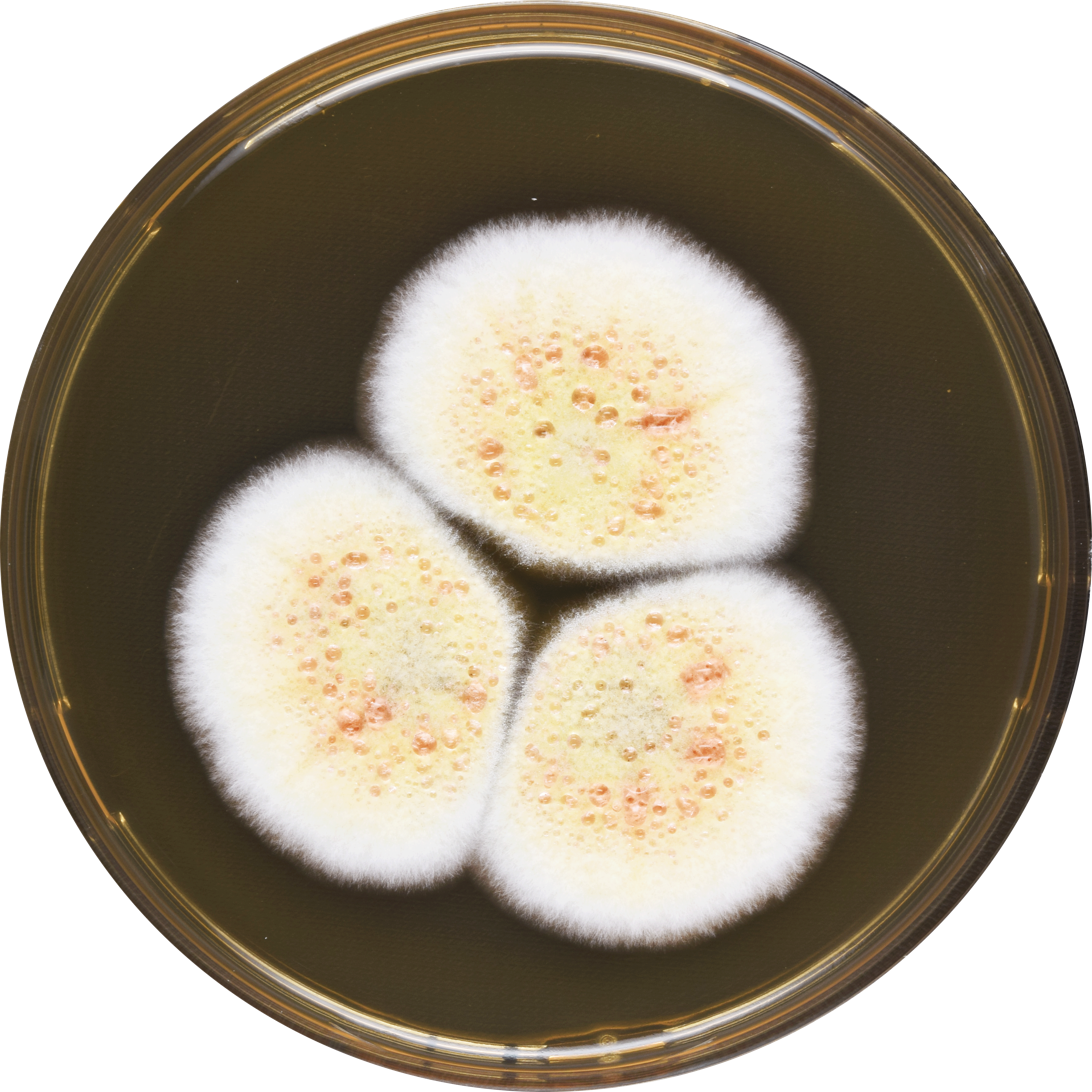
Aspergillus heterothallicus growing on MEAOX plate
