= Aspergillus baeticus =

Scientific classification
- Kingdom: Fungi
- Division: Ascomycota
- Class: Eurotiomycetes
- Order: Eurotiales
- Family: Aspergillaceae
- Genus: Aspergillus
- Species: A. baeticus

Binomial name
- Aspergillus baeticus A. Novakova & Hubka (2012)

Species of fungus

Aspergillus baeticus is a species of fungus in the genus Aspergillus. It is from the Usti section. The species was first described in 2012.

== Growth and morphology ==
A. baeticus has been cultivated on both Czapek yeast extract agar (CYA) plates and Malt Extract Agar Oxoid® (MEAOX) plates. The growth morphology of the colonies can be seen in the pictures below.

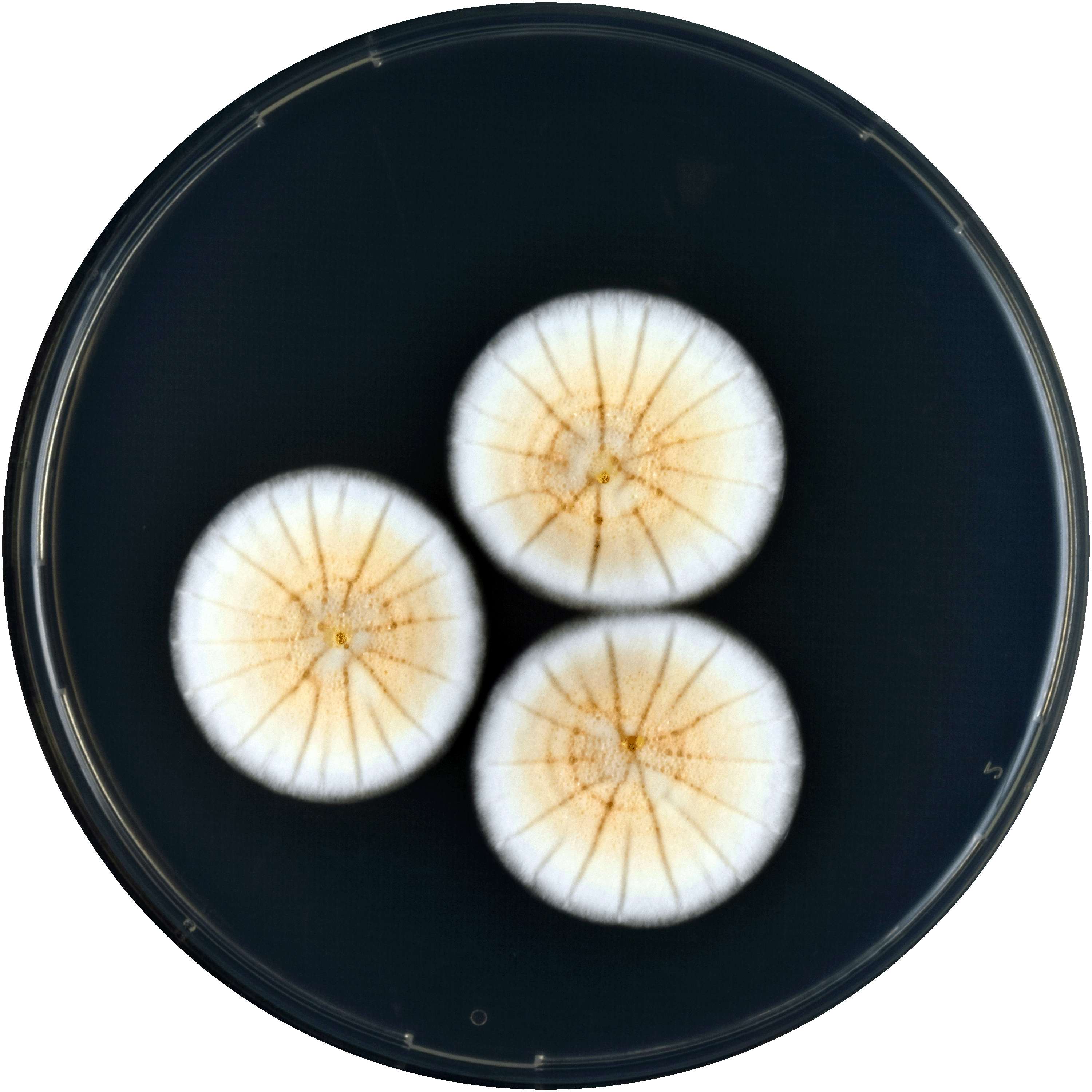
Aspergillus baeticus growing on CYA plate

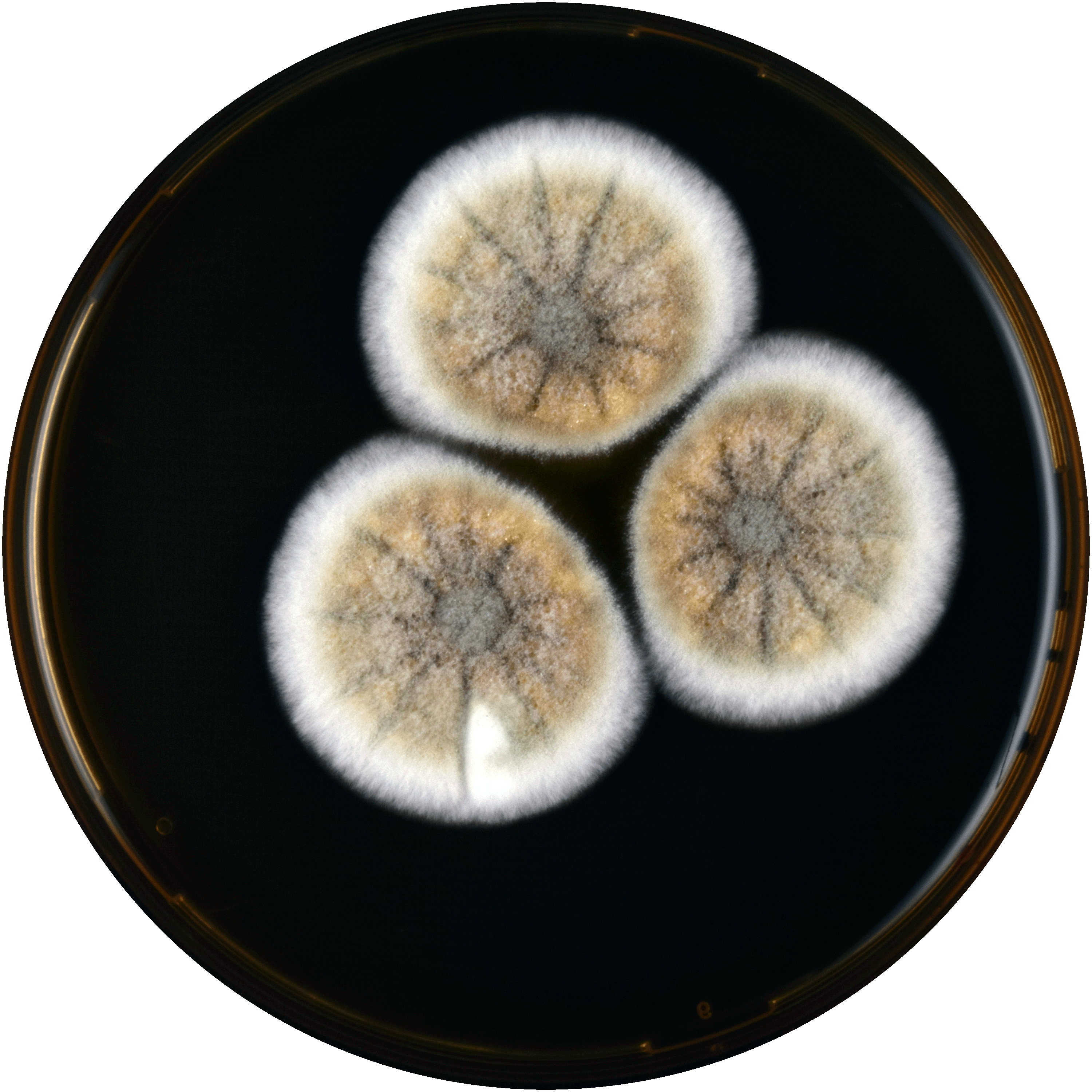
Aspergillus baeticus growing on MEAOX plate
