= Gregatin B =

Names
- IUPAC name Methyl (5R)-5-[(1E,3E)-hexa-1,3-dienyl]-2,5-dimethyl-4-oxofuran-3-carboxylate

Identifiers
| CAS Number | 58801-71-1 |
| 3D model (JSmol) | Interactive image |
| ChemSpider | 28288843 |
| PubChem CID | 53304446 |
- InChI: InChI=1S/C14H18O4/c1-5-6-7-8-9-14(3)12(15)11(10(2)18-14)13(16)17-4/h6-9H,5H2,1-4H3/b7-6+,9-8+/t14-/m1/s1 Key: BNZPIQOOHVBONM-PAMVGZKNSA-N
- SMILES: CC/C=C/C=C/[C@@]1(C(=O)C(=C(O1)C)C(=O)OC)C

Properties
| Chemical formula | C_{14}H_{18}O_{4} |
| Molar mass | 250.294 g·mol^{−1} |
- Except where otherwise noted, data are given for materials in their standard state (at 25 °C [77 °F], 100 kPa). Infobox references

Gregatin B is a metabolite of the fungi Cephalosporium gregatum and Aspergillus panamensis with the molecular formula C_{14}H_{18}O_{4} Gregatin B is a weak antibiotic. Gregatin B was discovered in 1982 and has been the subject of total synthesis.
