= Aspergillus granulosus =

Scientific classification
- Kingdom: Fungi
- Division: Ascomycota
- Class: Eurotiomycetes
- Order: Eurotiales
- Family: Aspergillaceae
- Genus: Aspergillus
- Species: A. granulosus

Binomial name
- Aspergillus granulosus Raper & Thom (1944)

Species of fungus

Aspergillus granulosus is a species of fungus in the genus Aspergillus. It is from the Usti section. The species was first described in 1944. It has been reported to produce asperugins, ustic acids, nidulol, and drimans.

== Growth and morphology ==
A. granulosus has been cultivated on both Czapek yeast extract agar (CYA) plates and Malt Extract Agar Oxoid® (MEAOX) plates. The growth morphology of the colonies can be seen in the pictures below.

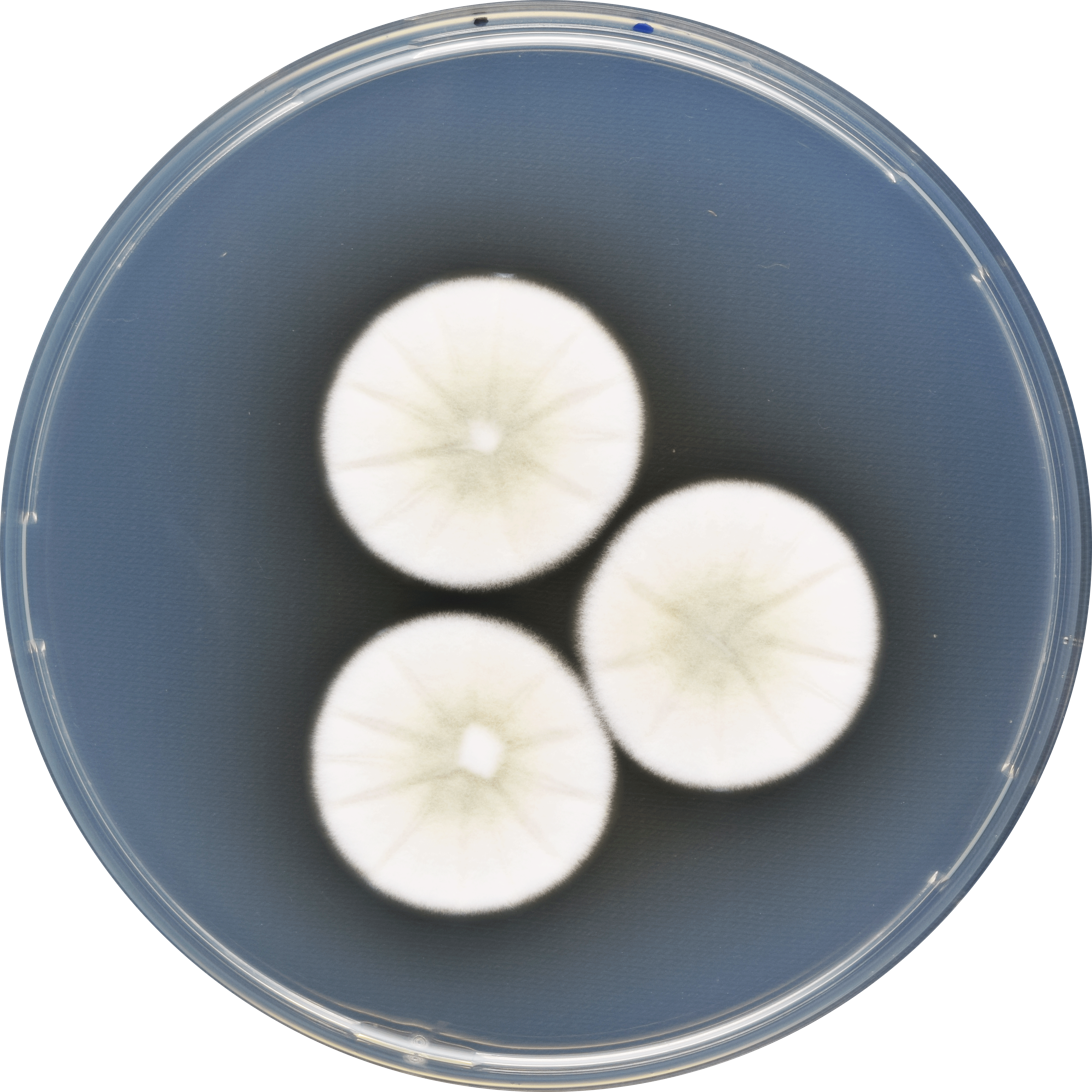
Aspergillus granulosus growing on CYA plate

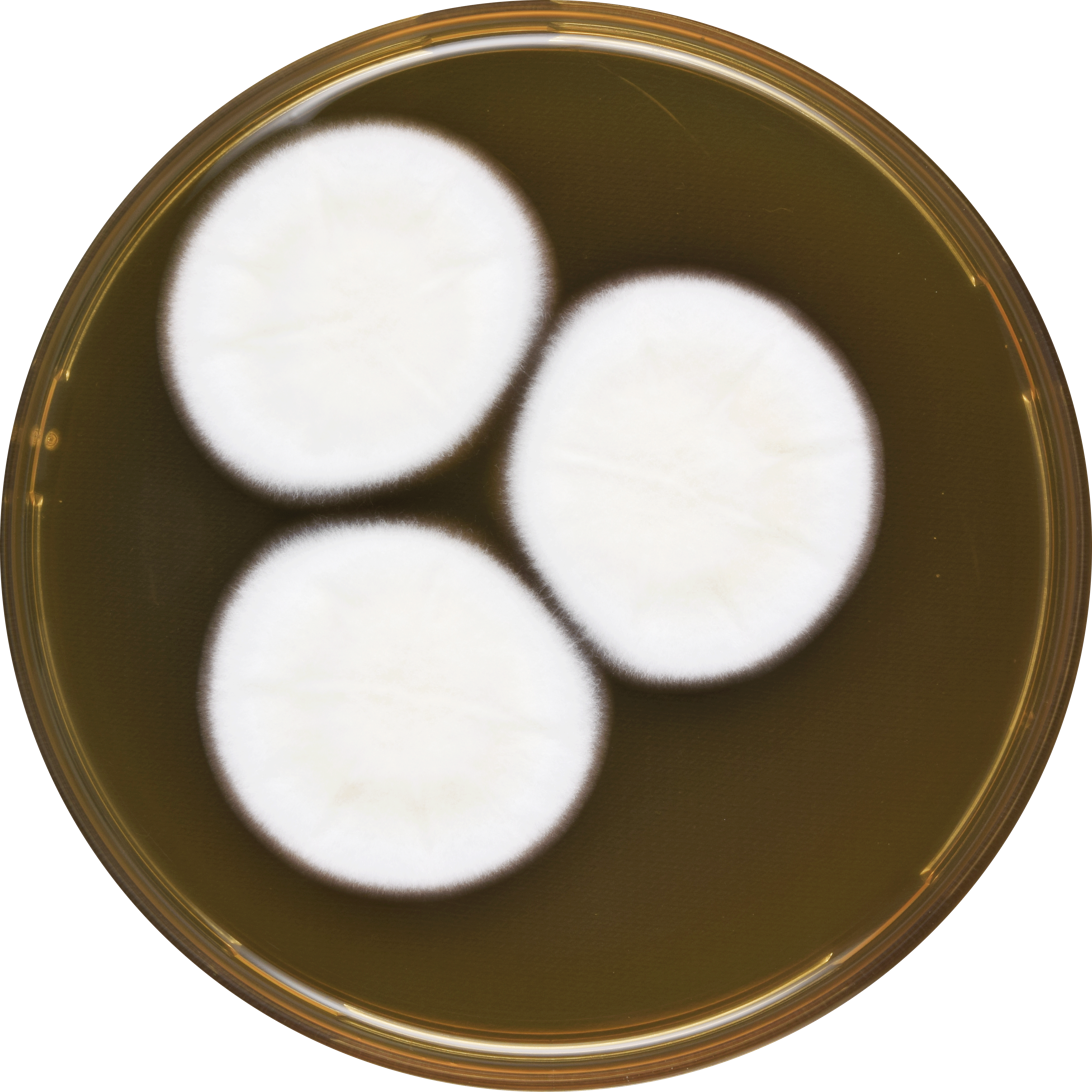
Aspergillus granulosus growing on MEAOX plate
