= Margaret Church =

American mycologist (1889–1976)

Margaret Brooks Church (1889 – 1976) was an American mycologist who specialized in Aspergillus and other fungi involved in food fermentation. She co-authored the first manual on Aspergillus with Charles Thom and worked with Thom on his treatise on Penicillium. She was the first westerner to study the ang-khak fermentation of rice using Monascus purpureus (see: Church, 1920), and studied other Asian soy fermentations involving the fungus known as Aspergillus oryzae. This research culminated in her writing a USDA bulletin entitled Soy and Related Fermentations in 1923. In 1928, she took on a role as the Head of Biology at Urbana University, Urbana, Ohio, before her retirement in 1939.

== Selected works ==
- Church, MB (1920). "Laboratory experiments on the manufacture of Chinese Ang-khak in the United States". J. Indust. Eng. Chem. 12: 45–46. doi:10.1021/ie50121a013.
- Church, MB (1923). "Soy and related fermentations". U.S.D.A. Dept. Bull. 1152: 1–26.
- Thom, C; Church, MB (1921). "Aspergillus flavus, A. oryzae and associated species". Am. J. Bot. 8 (2): 103–126. doi:10.2307/2435149. JSTOR 2435149.
- Thom C & Church MB. (1926) The Aspergilli. Williams & Wilkins Co., Baltimore, 272 pp.
