= Kenneth B. Raper =

American mycologist (1908–1987)

- Born: Kenneth Bryan Raper; July 11, 1908
- Died: January 15, 1987 (aged 78)
- Education: University of North Carolina at Chapel Hill (AB); George Washington University; Harvard University (PhD)
- Occupation: Mycologist
- Spouse: Louise Montgomery Williams
- Parent(s): William F. Raper; Julia Raper
- Relatives: John R. Raper (brother)

Kenneth Bryan Raper (July 11, 1908 – January 15, 1987) was an American mycologist.

== Life ==
Kenneth B. Raper was born in 1908 as the seventh of eight children to William F. Raper and his wife Julia. The children all worked on the family farm in Welcome, Davidson County, North Carolina, and were well educated. His younger brother John, nicknamed "Red", also became a mycologist. Kenneth was advanced from the sixth grade to the eighth, and enrolled at the University of North Carolina at Chapel Hill in 1925. There, he impressed his tutors so much that he was awarded a $260 annual assistantship, which enabled him to complete his A.B. degree, which he did in 1929.

Raper then went to Washington, D.C. to work in the new Division of Soil Microbiology at the Department of Agriculture, alongside Charles Thom. While there, he met and married Louise Montgomery Williams. He also enrolled at George Washington University following Thom's suggestion, and was awarded a master's degree in 1931. Thom also suggested Raper complete his studies at Harvard University, promising that his position would still be available when he finished. Working under William H. Weston at Harvard, Raper studied an organism he had collected in the Great Craggy Mountains of North Carolina during the summer vacation, and which he formally described as Dictyostelium discoideum in 1935. He was awarded a second master's degree in 1931, and a Ph.D. in 1936.

After Harvard, Raper re-joined the USDA, at a new laboratory set up in Peoria, Illinois, working on ways of improving yields of dairy derivatives. The English mycologists Howard Florey and Norman Heatley had been isolating penicillin at the University of Oxford, but were looked for ways to improve the quantities produced. The National Academy of Sciences directed them towards Raper's laboratory. Through collaborations with other groups across the United States, more efficient strains were identified – the best coming from a moldy cantaloupe brought in by a Peoria housewife in 1943 – and enough penicillin was produced to be made available to the Allied troops in time for the D-Day landings.

After the war, Raper stayed at Peoria, which he combined with teaching at the University of Illinois at Urbana–Champaign, but in 1953, he and his family moved to Madison, Wisconsin, where Raper had accepted a position at the University of Wisconsin–Madison. Notable students who continued his work on dictyostelid cellular slime molds include Theo Konijn and James Cavender. He remained at Madison even beyond his retirement 1979, as professor emeritus.

Raper was an elected member of the United States National Academy of Sciences, the American Academy of Arts and Sciences, and the American Philosophical Society.

== Work ==
Raper is best remembered for his works on three groups of organisms. He produced a Manual of the Aspergilli in 1945 with Charles Thom, incorporating their various earlier works on the genus Aspergillus. He was instrumental in the study of many strains of Penicillium, and their use in the production of penicillin. He also described the slime mold Dictyostelium discoideum, laying out the various features that made it a good study organism; it has gone on to become one of the most studied model species. He also stimulated subsequent work by his students on the diversity of dictyostelids.
