= Aspergillus venezuelensis =

Scientific classification
- Kingdom: Fungi
- Division: Ascomycota
- Class: Eurotiomycetes
- Order: Eurotiales
- Family: Aspergillaceae
- Genus: Aspergillus
- Species: A. venezuelensis

Binomial name
- Aspergillus venezuelensis Frisvad & Samson (2004)

Species of fungus

Aspergillus venezuelensis is a species of fungus in the genus Aspergillus. It is from the Nidulantes section. The species was first described in 2004. It has been shown to produce aflatoxin B1 and sterigmatocystin.

In 2016, the genome of A. venezuelensis was sequenced as a part of the Aspergillus whole-genome sequencing project - a project dedicated to performing whole-genome sequencing of all members of the genus Aspergillus. The genome assembly size was 34.84 Mbp.

== Growth and morphology ==
Aspergillus venezuelensis has been cultivated on both Czapek yeast extract agar (CYA) plates and Malt Extract Agar Oxoid (MEAOX) plates. The growth morphology of the colonies can be seen in the pictures below.

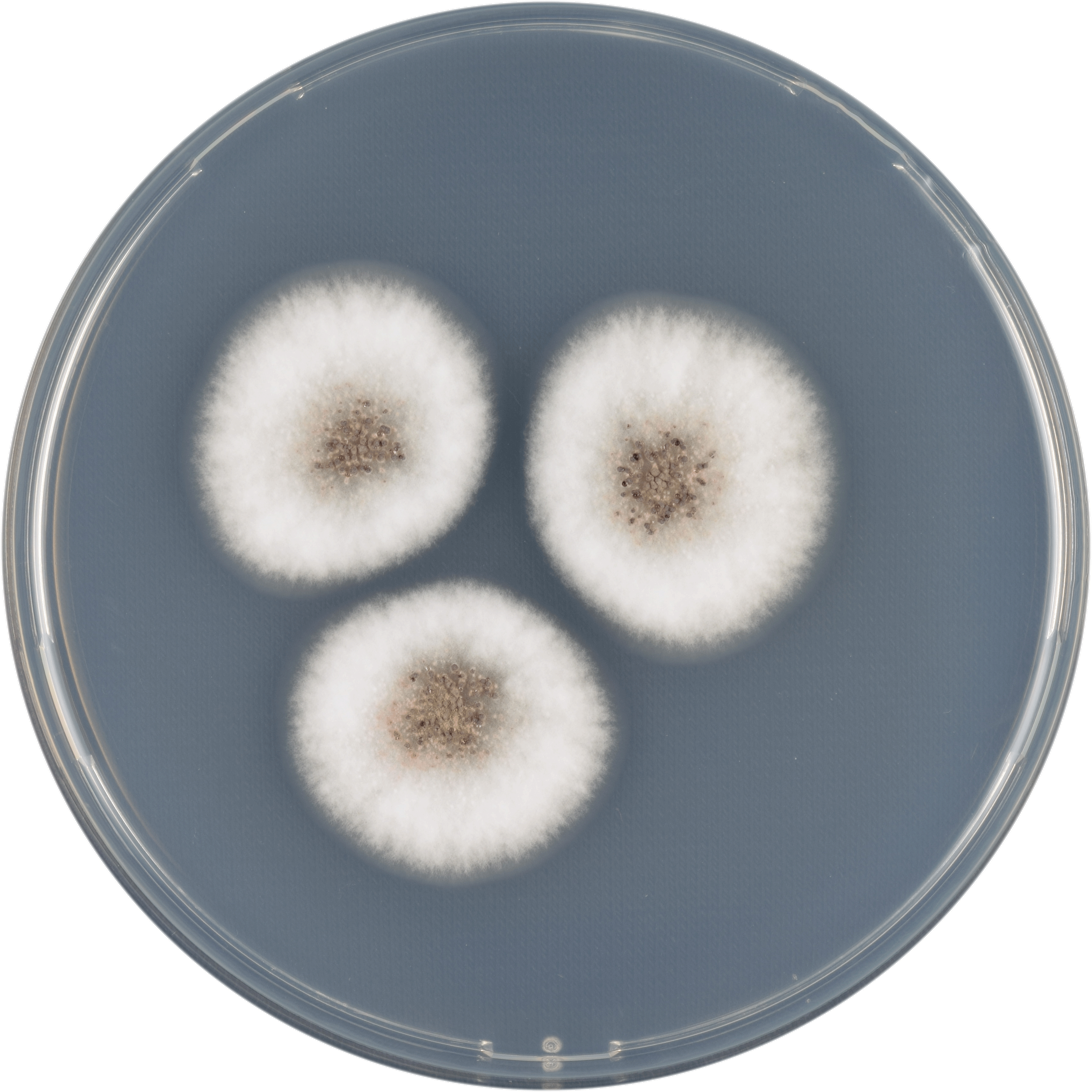
Aspergillus venezuelensis growing on CYA plate

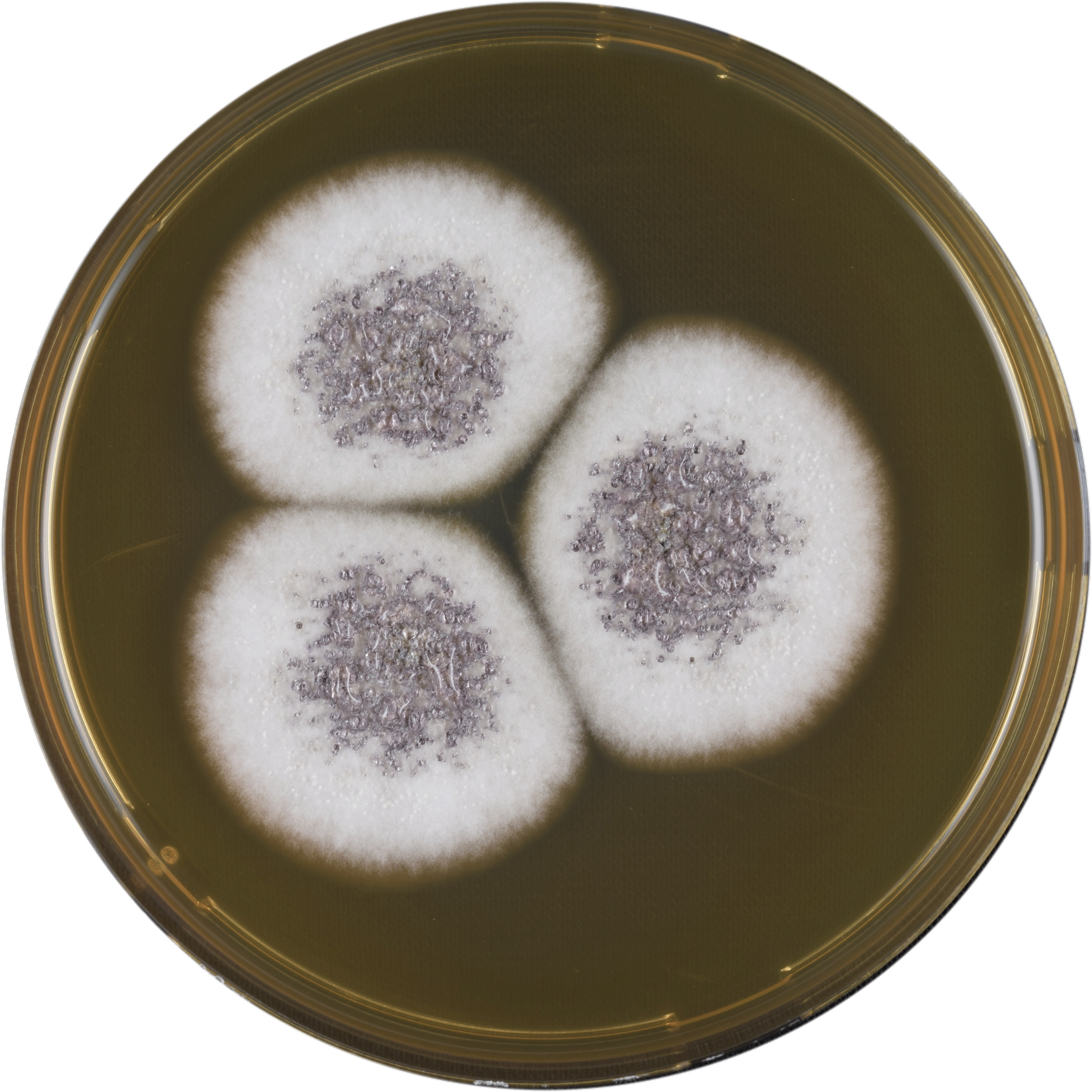
Aspergillus venezuelensis growing on MEAOX plate
