= Aspergillus corrugatus =

Scientific classification
- Kingdom: Fungi
- Division: Ascomycota
- Class: Eurotiomycetes
- Order: Eurotiales
- Family: Aspergillaceae
- Genus: Aspergillus
- Species: A. corrugatus

Binomial name
- Aspergillus corrugatus Udagawa & Y. Horie (1976)

Species of fungus

Aspergillus corrugatus is a species of fungus in the genus Aspergillus. It is from the Nidulantes section. The species was first described in 1976. It has been isolated from soil in Thailand. It has been reported to produce asperthecin, emecorrugatin A, emecorrugatin B, sterigmatocystin, and norsolorinic acid.

== Growth and morphology ==
A. corrugatus has been cultivated on both Czapek yeast extract agar (CYA) plates and Malt Extract Agar Oxoid® (MEAOX) plates. The growth morphology of the colonies can be seen in the pictures below.

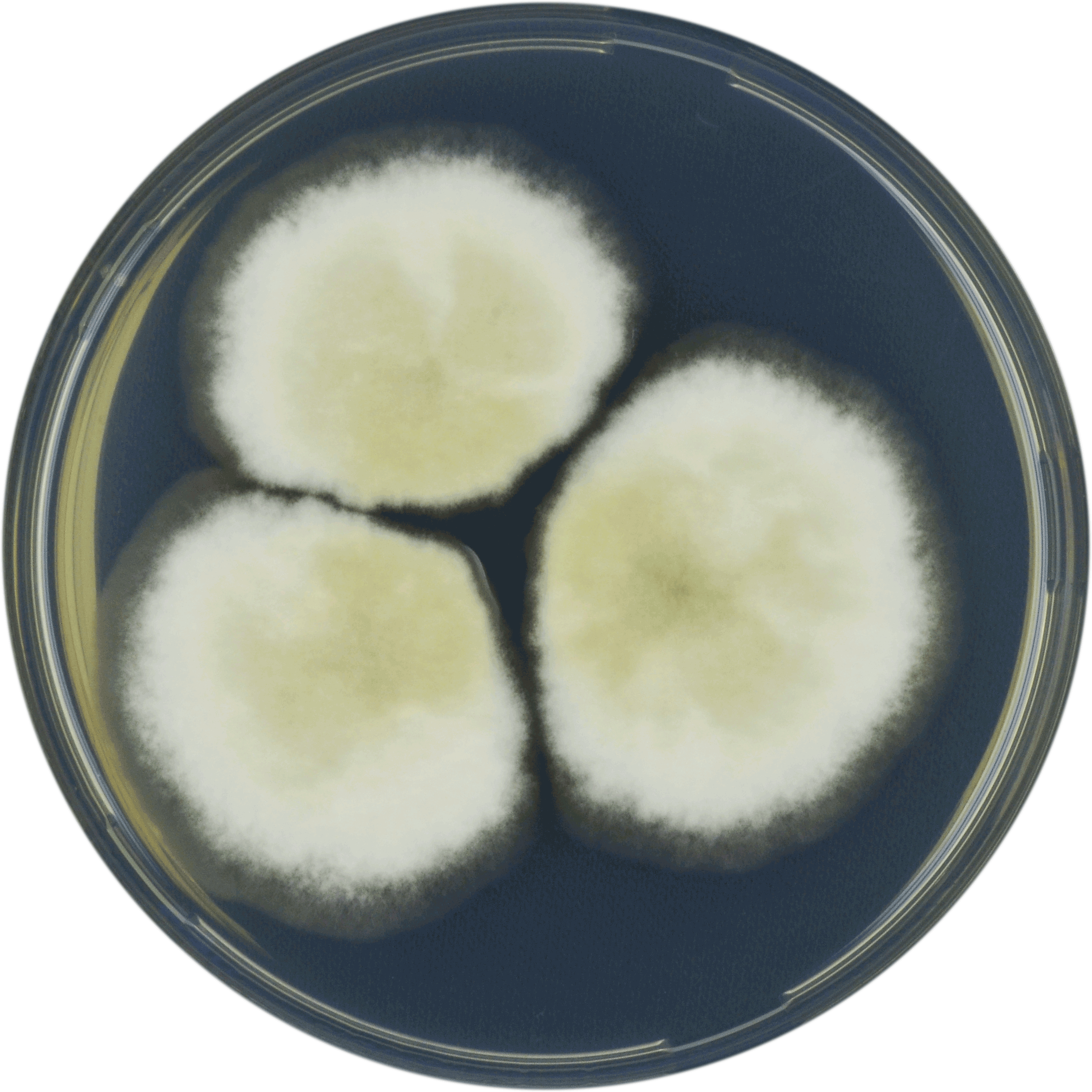
Aspergillus corrugatus growing on CYA plate

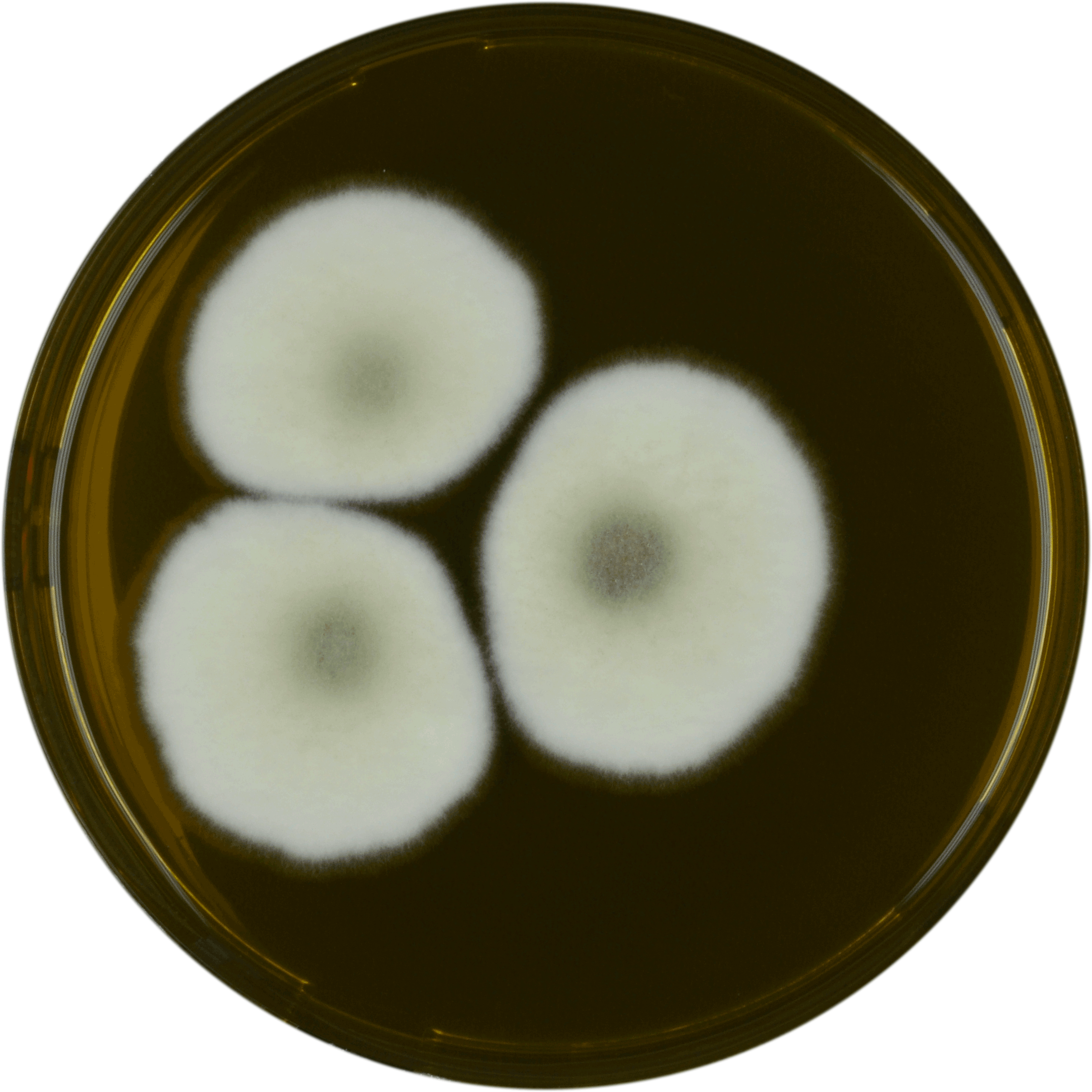
Aspergillus corrugatus growing on MEAOX plate
