= Aspergillus rambellii =

Scientific classification
- Kingdom: Fungi
- Division: Ascomycota
- Class: Eurotiomycetes
- Order: Eurotiales
- Family: Aspergillaceae
- Genus: Aspergillus
- Species: A. rambellii

Binomial name
- Aspergillus rambellii Frisvad & Samson

Species of fungus

Aspergillus rambellii is a species of fungus in the genus Aspergillus. It is from the Ochraceorosei section. The species was first described in 2005. It accumulates very large amounts of sterigmatocystin, 3-O-methylsterigmatocystin and aflatoxin B1.

== Growth and morphology ==
A. rambellii has been cultivated on both Czapek yeast extract agar (CYA) plates and Malt Extract Agar Oxoid® (MEAOX) plates. The growth morphology of the colonies can be seen in the pictures below.

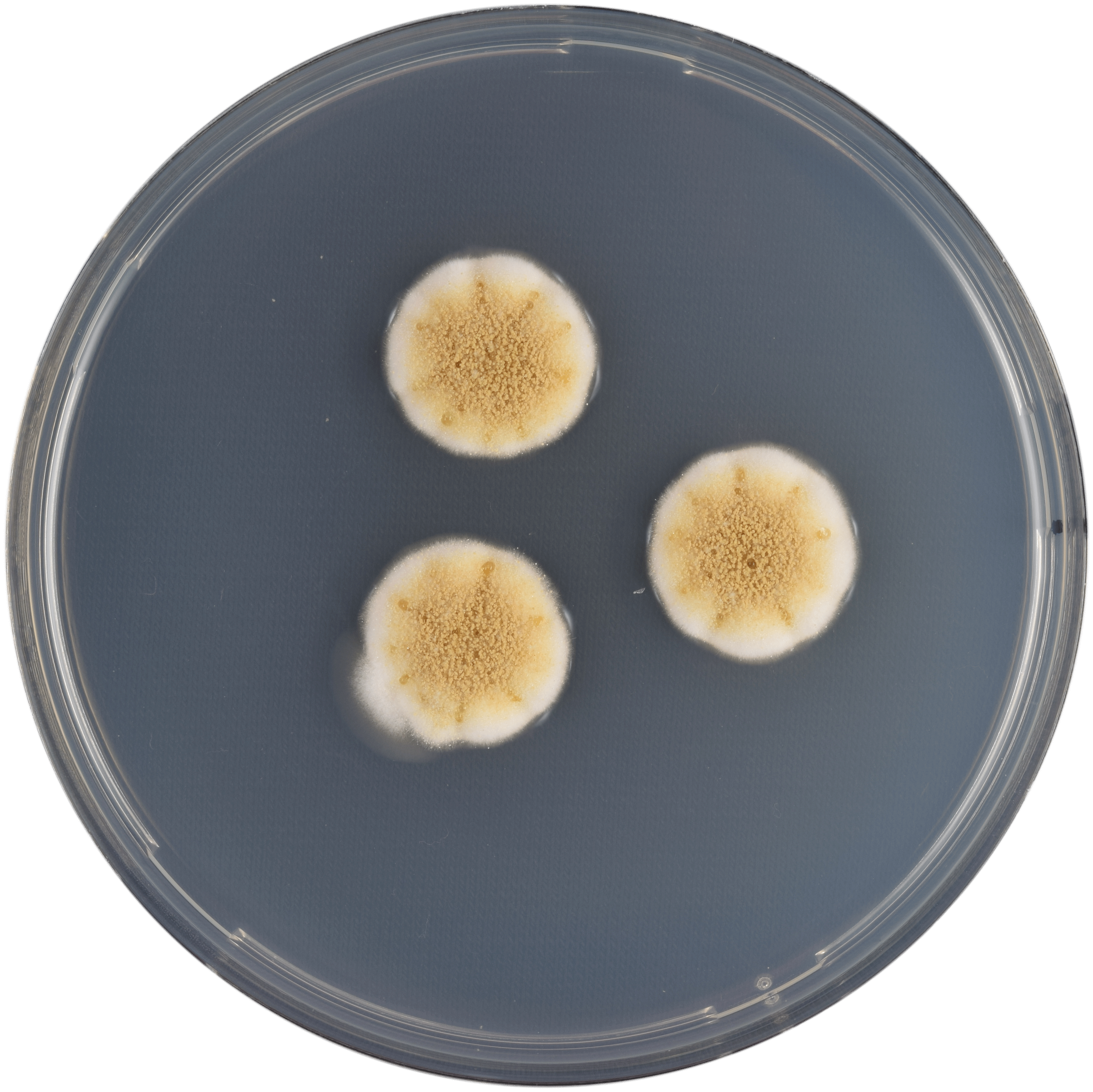
Aspergillus rambellii growing on CYA plate

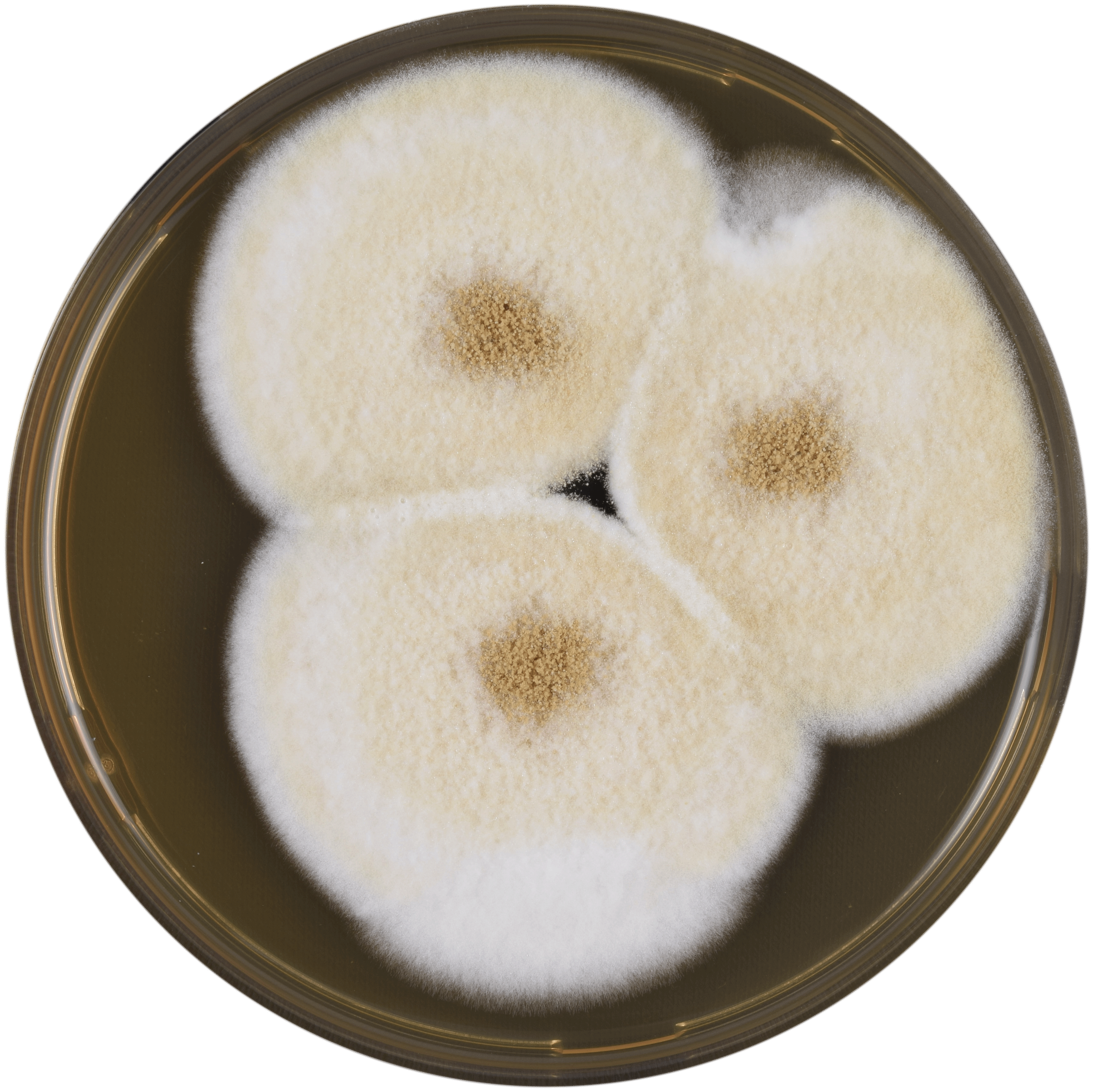
Aspergillus rambellii growing on MEAOX plate
