= C17H12O7 =

The molecular formula C_{17}H_{12}O_{7} may refer to:

- Aflatoxin B_{1} exo-8,9-epoxide, a toxic metabolite of aflatoxin B1
- Aflatoxin M_{1}, a chemical compound of the aflatoxin class
