= Aspergillus violaceus =

Scientific classification
- Kingdom: Fungi
- Division: Ascomycota
- Class: Eurotiomycetes
- Order: Eurotiales
- Family: Aspergillaceae
- Genus: Aspergillus
- Species: A. violaceus

Binomial name
- Aspergillus violaceus Fennell & Raper (1955)

Species of fungus

Aspergillus violaceus is a species of fungus in the genus Aspergillus. It is from the Nidulantes section. The species was first described in 1955. It has been isolated from soil in Ghana. It has been reported to produce aspermutarubrol, asperthecin, desferritriacetylfusigen, sterigmatocystin, violaceol I, violaceol II, and violaceic acid.

== Growth and morphology ==
A. violaceus has been cultivated on both Czapek yeast extract agar (CYA) plates and yeast extract sucrose agar (YES) plates. The growth morphology of the colonies can be seen in the pictures below.

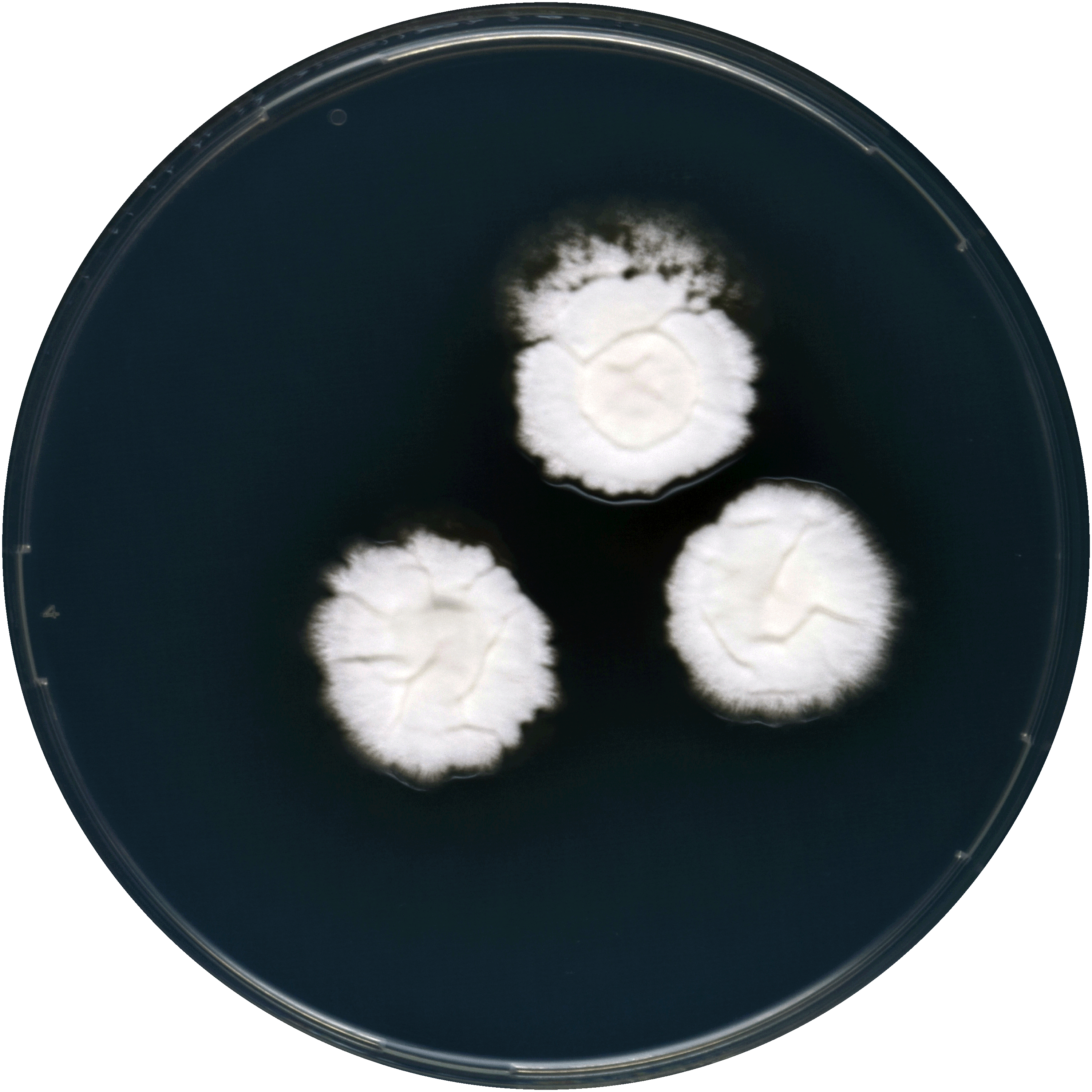
Aspergillus violaceus growing on CYA plate

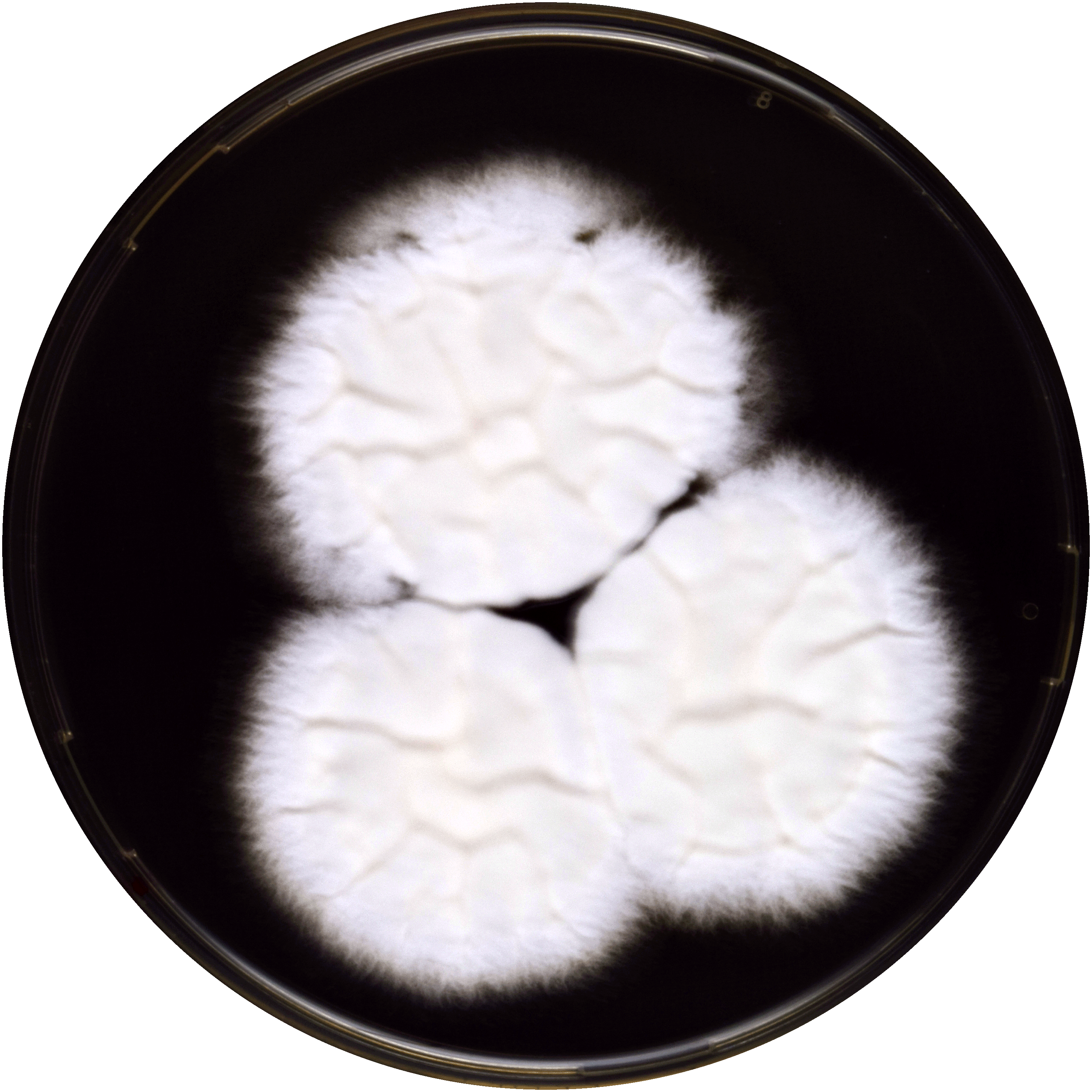
Aspergillus violaceus growing on YES plate
