= Aspergillus fructiculosus =

Scientific classification
- Kingdom: Fungi
- Division: Ascomycota
- Class: Eurotiomycetes
- Order: Eurotiales
- Family: Aspergillaceae
- Genus: Aspergillus
- Species: A. fructiculosus

Binomial name
- Aspergillus fructiculosus Raper & Fennell (1965)

Synonyms
- Emericella fruticulosa, Aspergillus fruticans

Species of fungus

Aspergillus fructiculosus (also known as Emericella fruticulosa, Aspergillus fruticans) is a species of fungus in the genus Aspergillus. The species was first described in 1965. It has been reported to produce sterigmatocystin.
