= Aspergillus ochraceoroseus =

Scientific classification
- Kingdom: Fungi
- Division: Ascomycota
- Class: Eurotiomycetes
- Order: Eurotiales
- Family: Aspergillaceae
- Genus: Aspergillus
- Species: A. ochraceoroseus

Binomial name
- Aspergillus ochraceoroseus Bartoli & Maggi (1979)

Species of fungus

Aspergillus ochraceoroseus is a species of fungus in the genus Aspergillus. It is from the Ochraceorosei section. The species was first described in 1979. It has been isolated from soil in the Tai National Forest in the Ivory Coast. It has been shown to produce aflatoxin and sterigmatocystin.

In 2014, the genome of A. ochraceoroseus was sequenced as a part of the Aspergillus whole-genome sequencing project - a project dedicated to performing whole-genome sequencing of all members of the genus Aspergillus. The genome assembly size was 27.72 Mbp.

== Growth and morphology ==
Aspergillus ochraceoroseus has been cultivated on both Czapek yeast extract agar (CYA) plates and Malt Extract Agar Oxoid (MEAOX) plates. The growth morphology of the colonies can be seen in the pictures below.

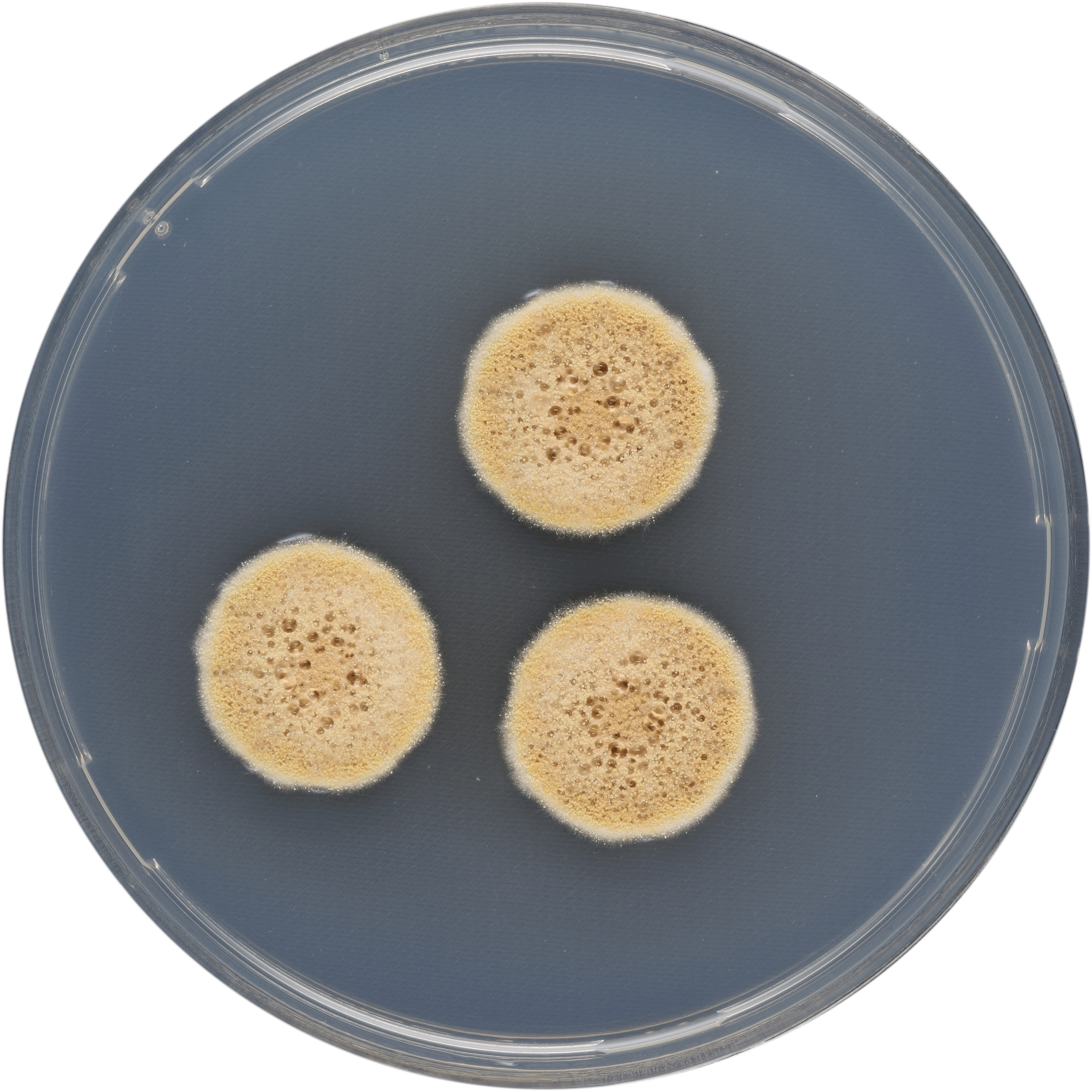
Aspergillus ochraceoroseus growing on CYA plate

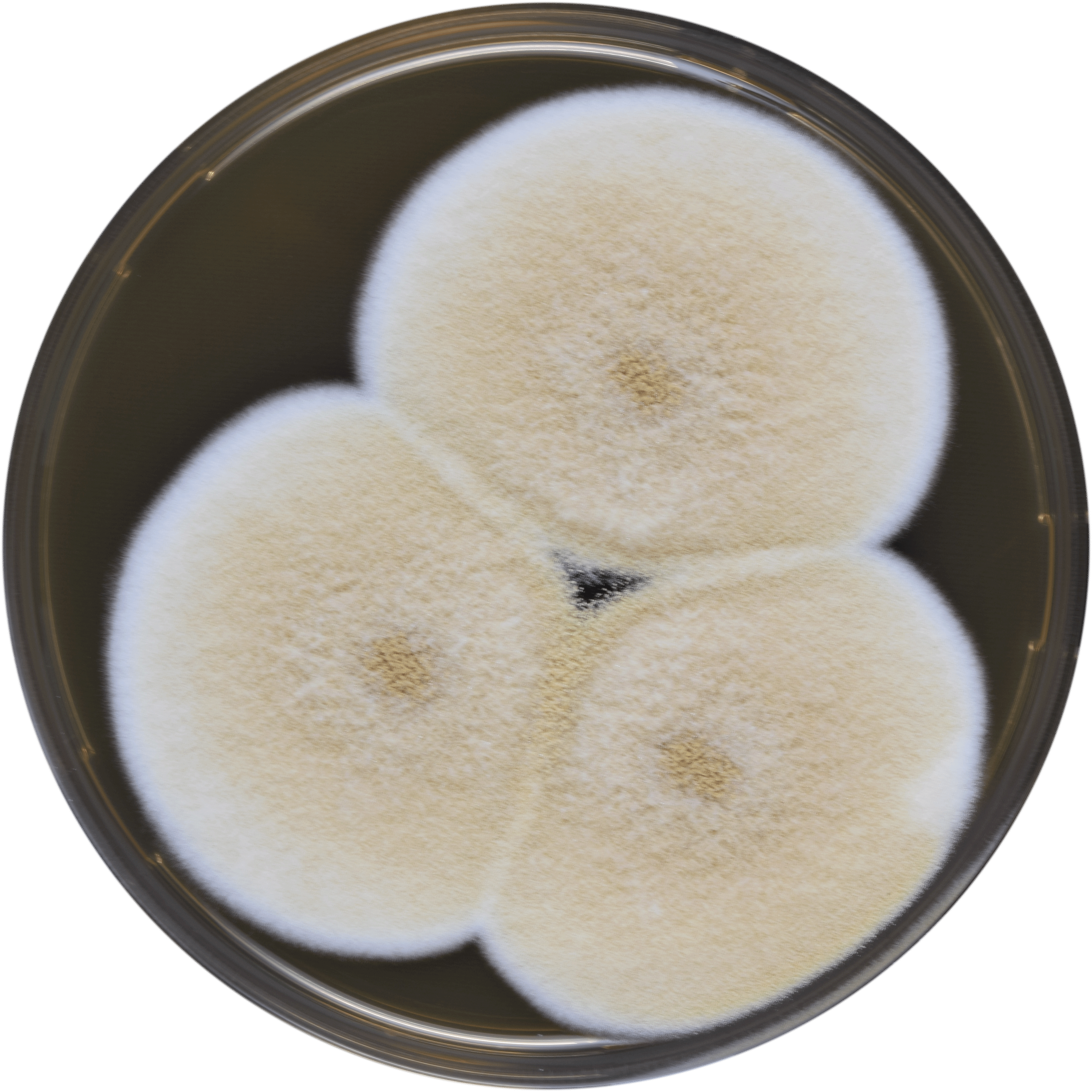
Aspergillus ochraceoroseus growing on MEAOX plate
