= Aspergillus navahoensis =

Scientific classification
- Kingdom: Fungi
- Division: Ascomycota
- Class: Eurotiomycetes
- Order: Eurotiales
- Family: Aspergillaceae
- Genus: Aspergillus
- Species: A. navahoensis

Binomial name
- Aspergillus navahoensis M. Christensen & States (1982)

Species of fungus

Aspergillus navahoensis is a species of fungus in the genus Aspergillus. It is from the Nidulantes section. The species was first described in 1982. It was isolated from sand in Arizona, United States. It has been reported to produce averufin, norsolorinic acid, 6,7,8-trihydroxy-3-methylisocoumarin, desferritriacetylfusigen, echinocandin B, and sterigmatocystin.

== Growth and morphology ==
A. navahoensis has been cultivated on both Czapek yeast extract agar (CYA) plates and Malt Extract Agar Oxoid® (MEAOX) plates. The growth morphology of the colonies can be seen in the pictures below.

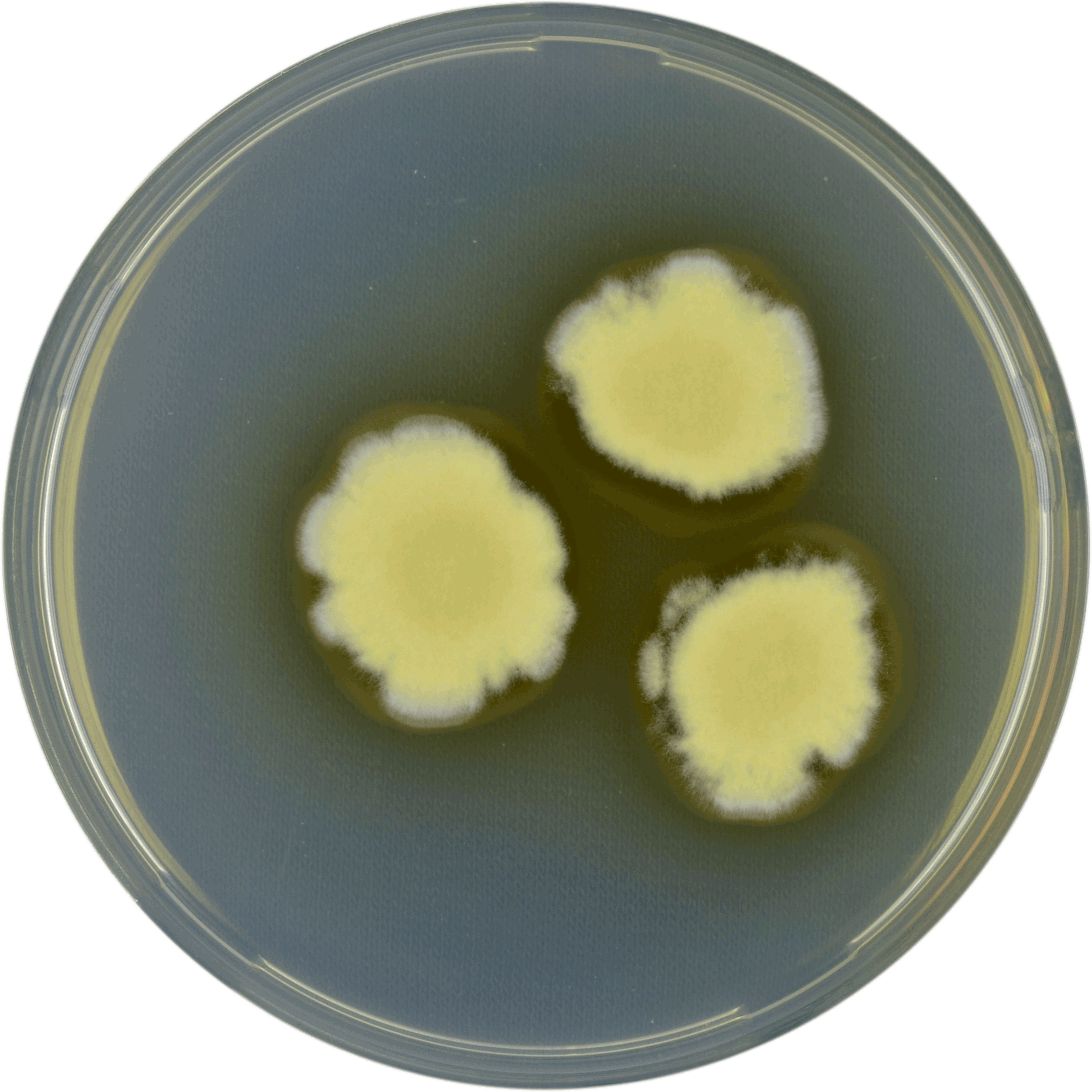
Aspergillus navahoensis growing on CYA plate

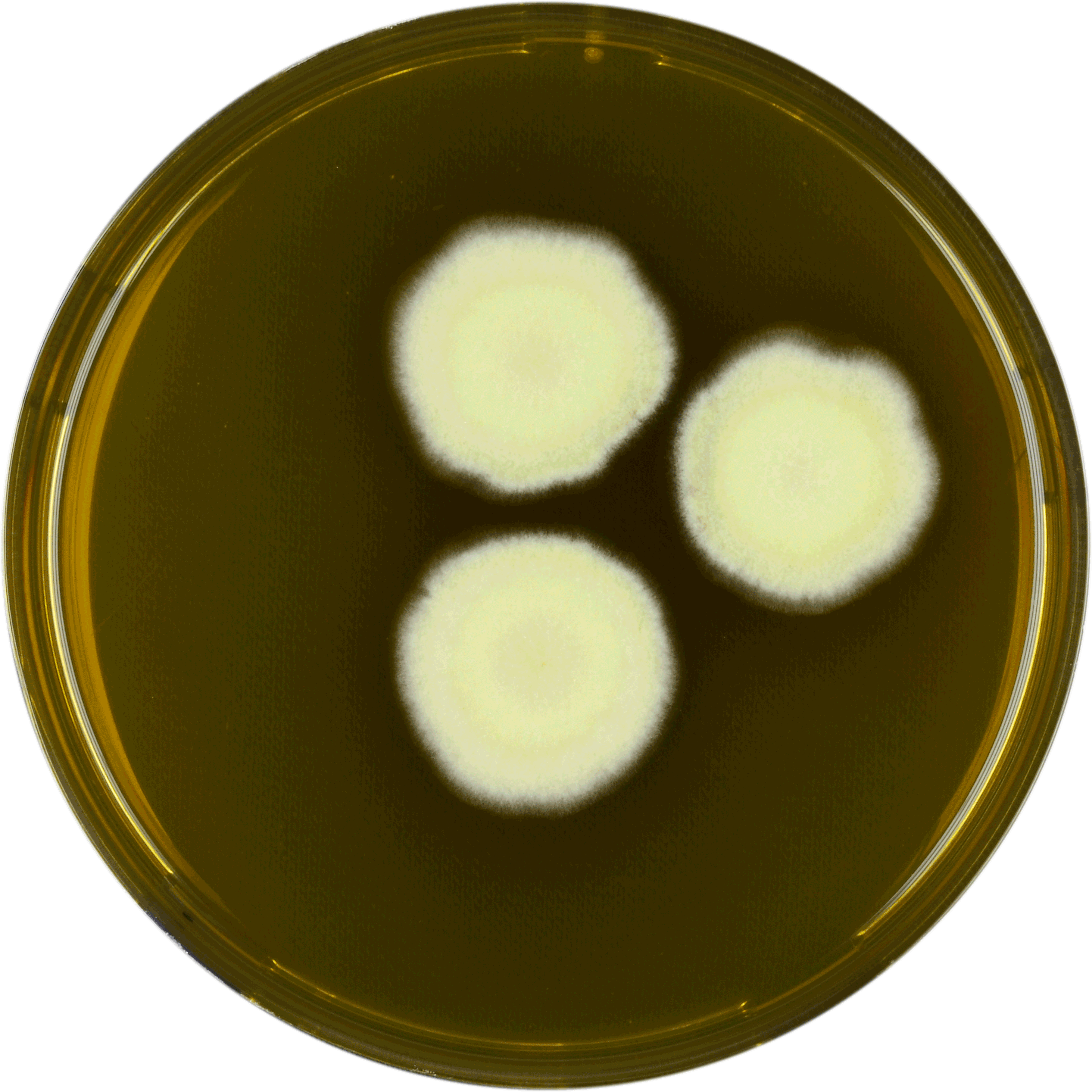
Aspergillus navahoensis growing on MEAOX plate
