= Penicillium inflatum =

Scientific classification
- Kingdom: Fungi
- Division: Ascomycota
- Class: Eurotiomycetes
- Order: Eurotiales
- Family: Aspergillaceae
- Genus: Penicillium
- Species: P. inflatum

Binomial name
- Penicillium inflatum Stolk & Malla (1971)

Type strain
- ATCC 48994, CBS 682.70, CCFC007491, CCFC007492, DAOM 213168, FRR 1549, IMI 191498, MUCL 38965, NRRL 5179

Synonyms
- Aspergillus inflatus

Species of fungus

Penicillium inflatum (also named Aspergillus inflatum) is an anamorph species of the genus of Penicillium which produces sterigmatocystin. It is from the Cremei section.

== Growth and morphology ==
A. inflatus has been cultivated on both Czapek yeast extract agar (CYA) plates and Malt Extract Agar Oxoid® (MEAOX) plates. The growth morphology of the colonies can be seen in the pictures below.

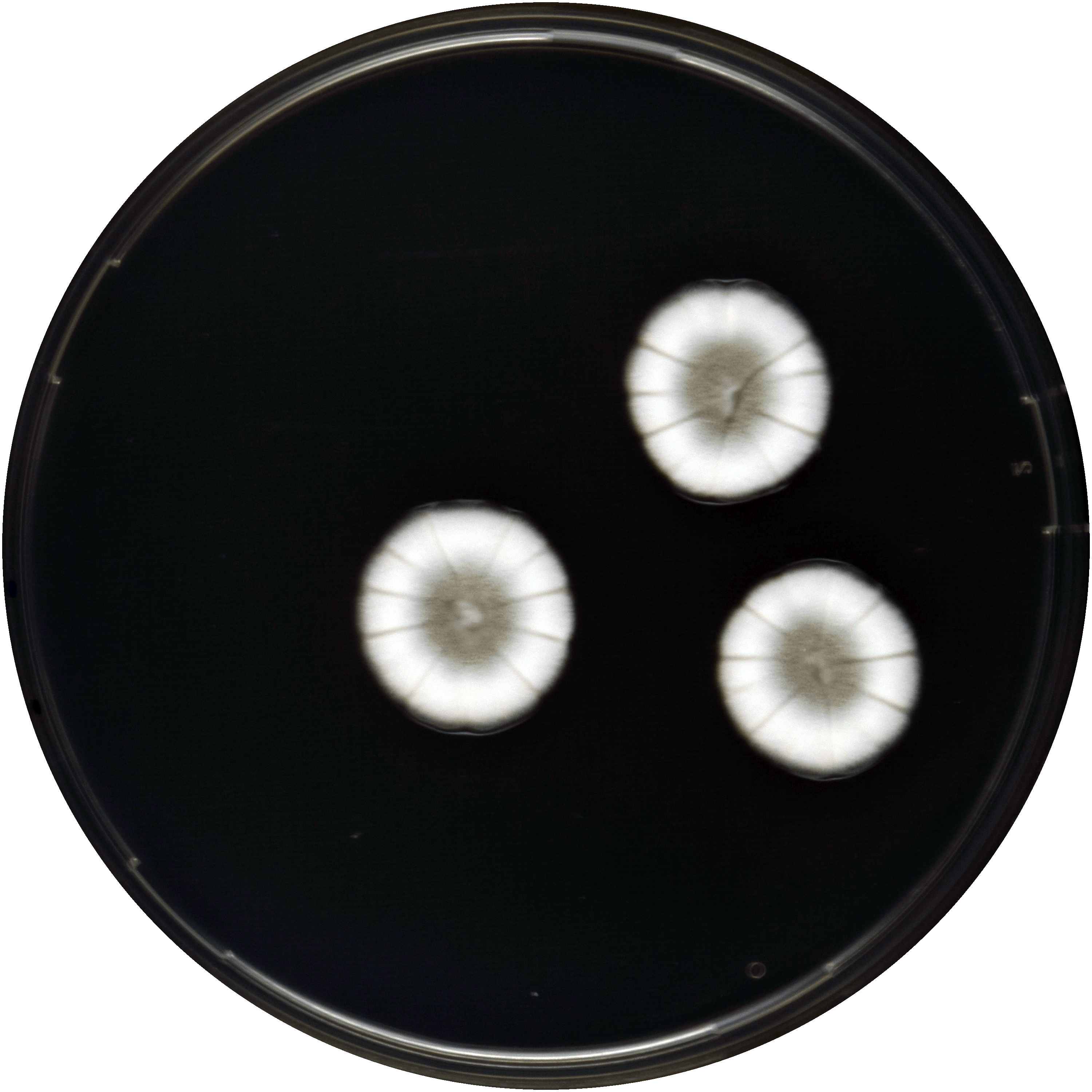
Penicillium inflatus growing on CYA plate

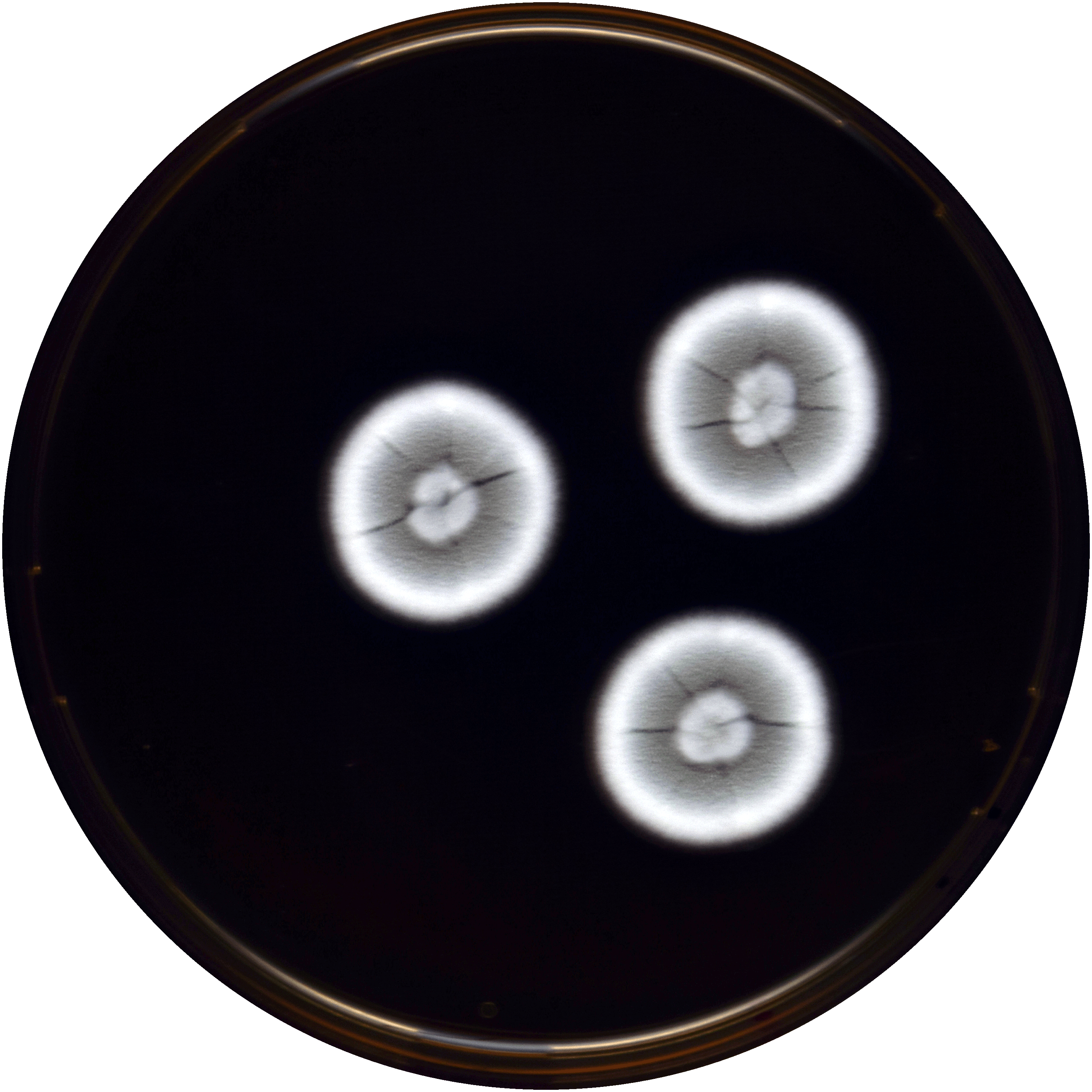
Penicillium inflatus growing on MEAOX plate
