= Aspergillus novoparasiticus =

Scientific classification
- Kingdom: Fungi
- Division: Ascomycota
- Class: Eurotiomycetes
- Order: Eurotiales
- Family: Aspergillaceae
- Genus: Aspergillus
- Species: A. novoparasiticus

Binomial name
- Aspergillus novoparasiticus Gonçalves, Stchigel, Cano, Godoy-Martinez, Colombo & Guarro (2011)

Species of fungus

Aspergillus novoparasiticus is a species of fungus in the genus Aspergillus. It is from the Flavi section. The species was first described in 2011. It has been reported to produce aflatoxin B1, aflatoxin B2, aflatoxin G1, and aflatoxin G2. A. novoparasiticus has been isolated from hospital patients. Recently, it has been reported in maize from Brazil.

== Growth and morphology ==
A. novoparasiticus has been cultivated on both Czapek yeast extract agar (CYA) plates and Malt Extract Agar Oxoid® (MEAOX) plates. The growth morphology of the colonies can be seen in the pictures below.

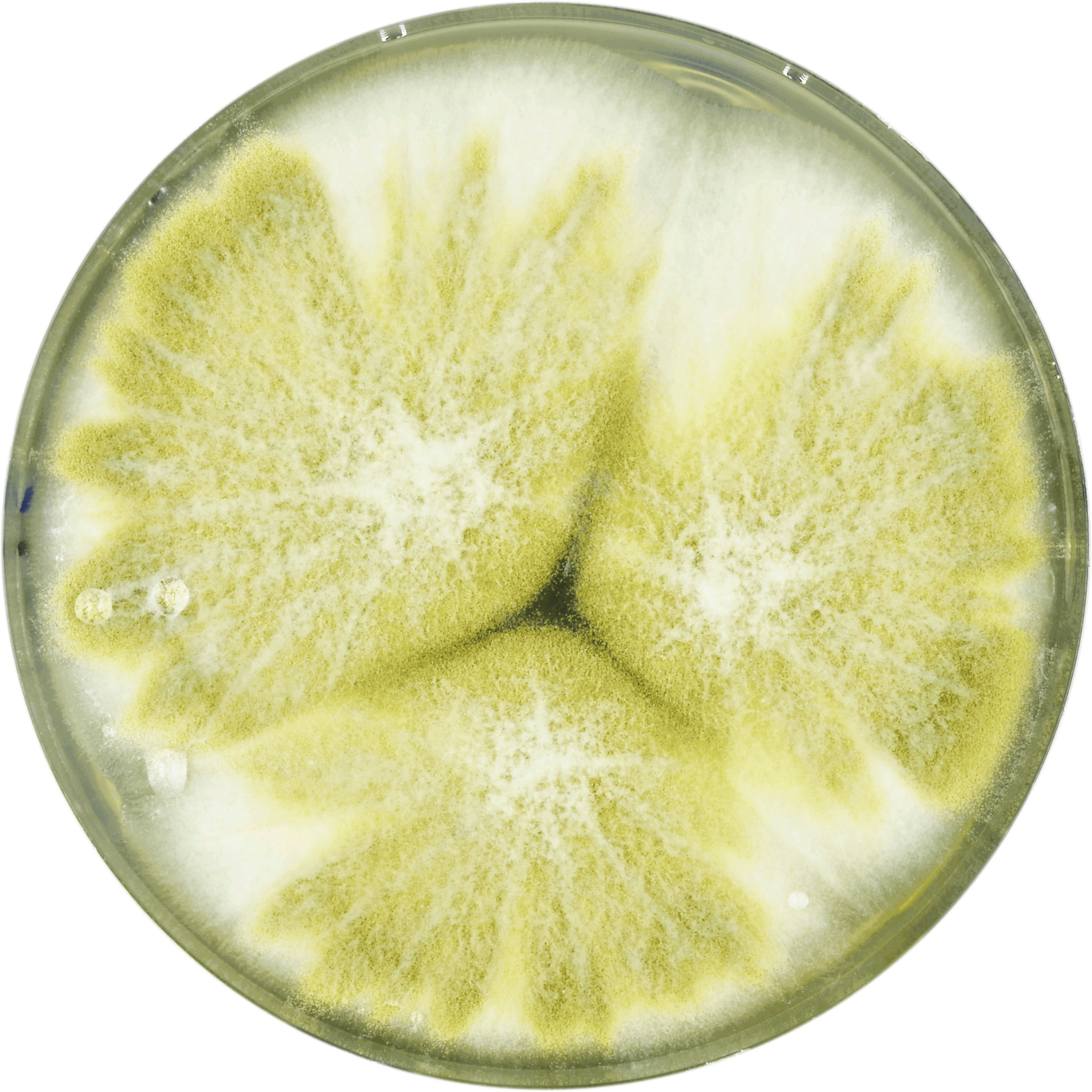
Aspergillus novoparasiticus growing on CYA plate

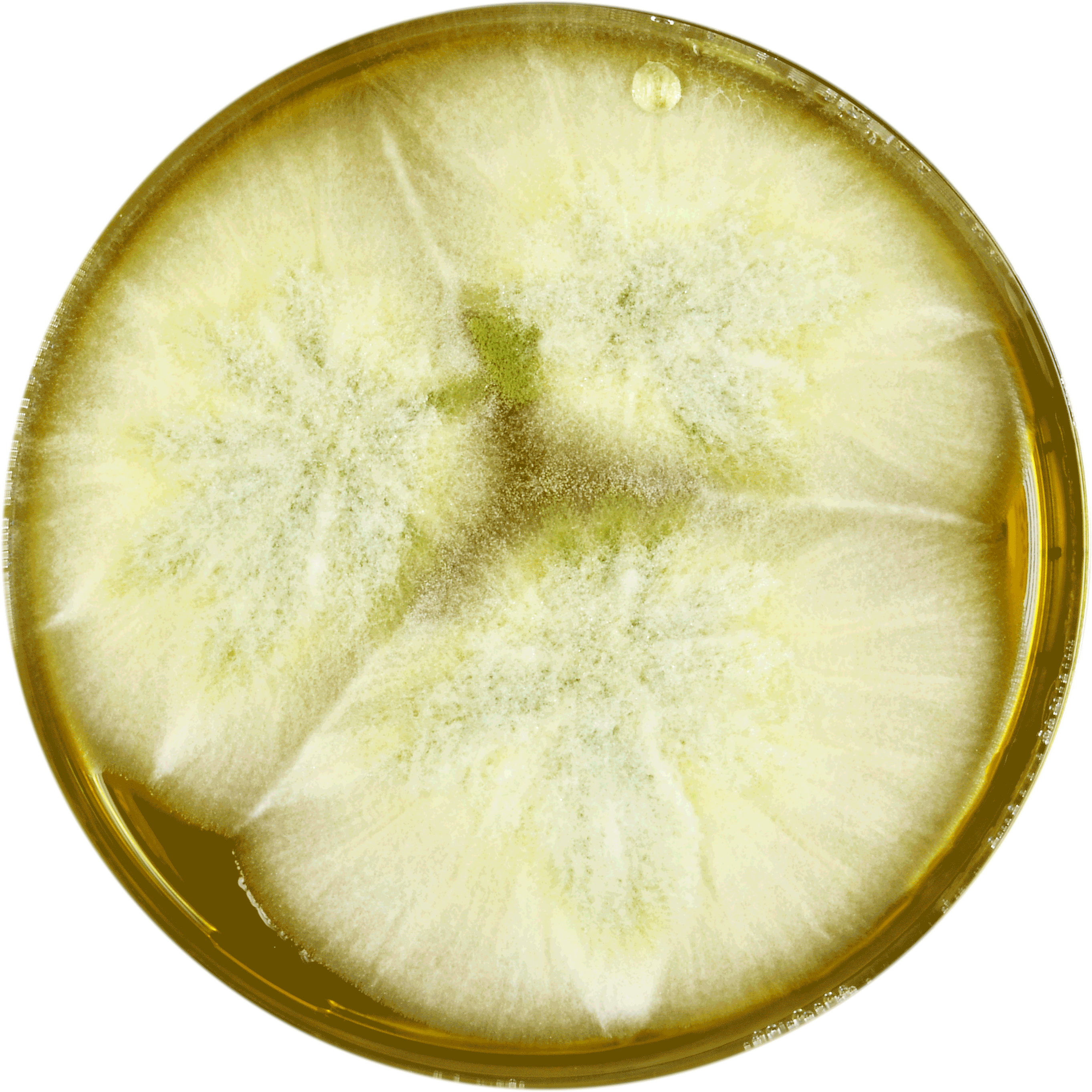
Aspergillus novoparasiticus growing on MEAOX plate
