= Aspergillus purpureus =

Scientific classification
- Kingdom: Fungi
- Division: Ascomycota
- Class: Eurotiomycetes
- Order: Eurotiales
- Family: Aspergillaceae
- Genus: Aspergillus
- Species: A. purpureus

Binomial name
- Aspergillus purpureus Samson & Mouchacca (1975)

Species of fungus

Aspergillus purpureus is a species of fungus in the genus Aspergillus. It is from the Nidulantes section. The species was first described in 1975. It has been isolated from soil in Egypt. It has been reported to produce emindol SA, emindol SB, emindol SC, epurpurin A-C, sterigmatocystin, variecolactone, variecolin, and variecolol.

== Growth and morphology ==
A. purpureus has been cultivated on both Czapek yeast extract agar (CYA) plates and Malt Extract Agar Oxoid® (MEAOX) plates. The growth morphology of the colonies can be seen in the pictures below.

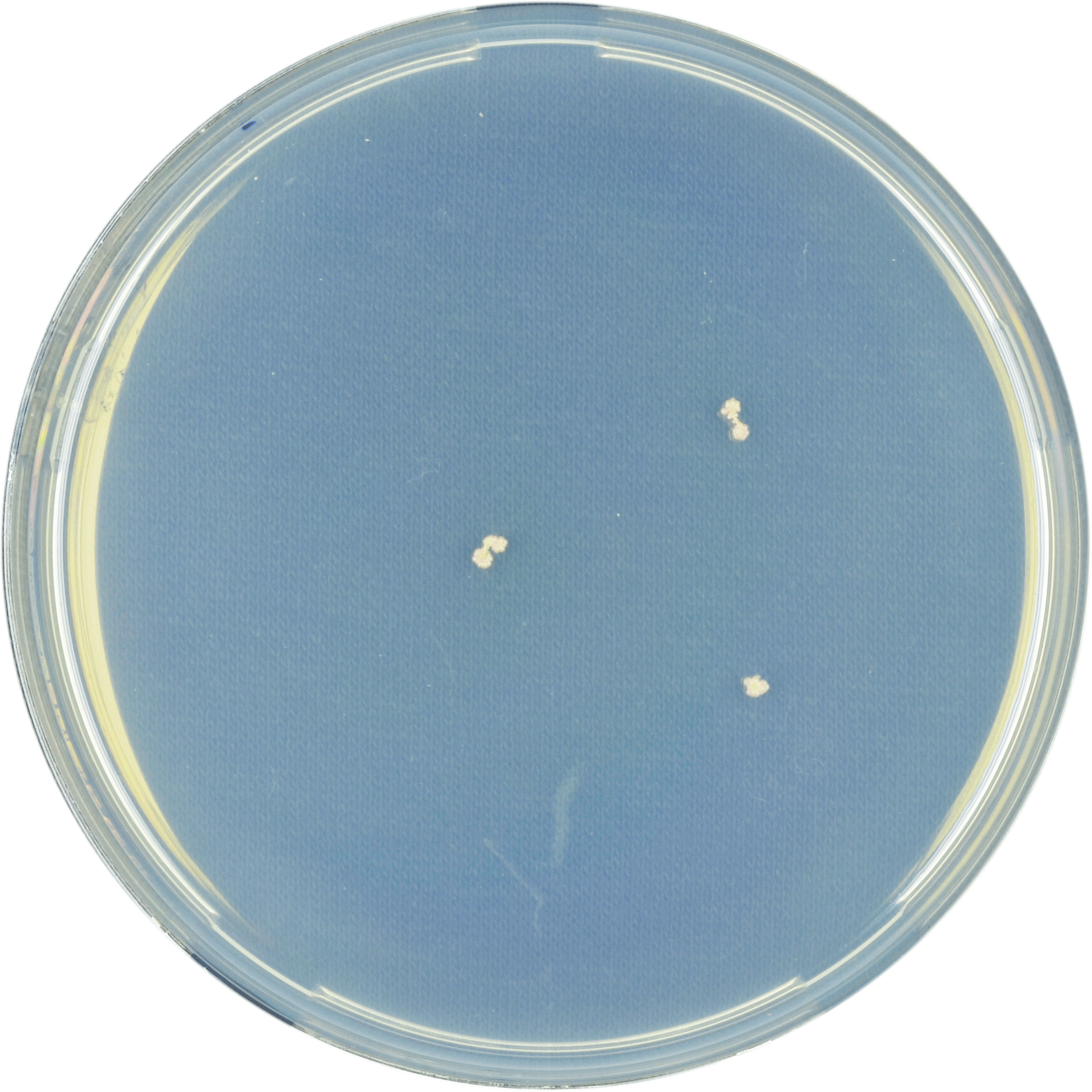
Aspergillus purpureus growing on CYA plate

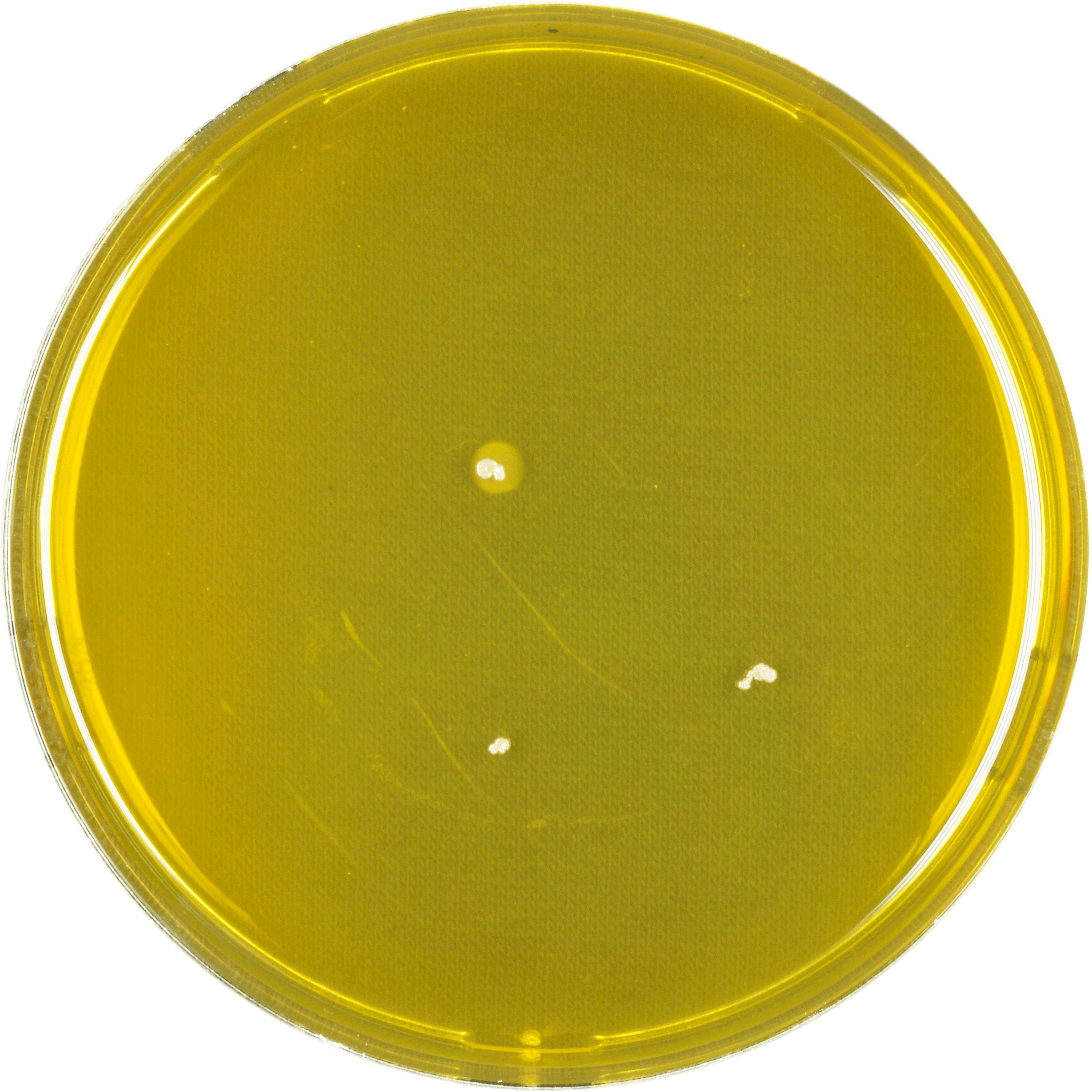
Aspergillus purpureus growing on MEAOX plate
