= Dermatotoxin =

A dermatotoxin or dermatoxin (from derma, the Greek word for skin) is a toxic chemical that damages skin, mucous membranes, or both, often leading to tissue necrosis. These can come in the form of natural and synthetic chemicals and can be found in drugs.

These chemicals have been found in cosmetics, lotions, drugs and some chemical weapons. Many dermatoxins are also considered vesicants, or blister agents, meaning they are irritating enough to the skin when applied to cause it to blister. Additionally, many of the effects of these toxins are activated by light.

Both terms, "dermatotoxin" and "dermatoxin" are considered grammatically correct names for these substances.

== Toxicology ==
The severity of the effects of a dermatoxic agent is strongly dependent on the dose, route of exposure, rate at which it spreads, and the overall health of the afflicted individual. However, prolonged contact can cause tissue necrosis or allergic contact dermatitis, which can lead to skin cancer, chemical burns, irritant dermatitis, photodermatitis, phototoxicity, changes to pigmentation, and urticaria, or hives.

== Examples of dermatoxic substances ==
- T-2 toxin
- Sterigmatocystin
- Sulfur mustard
- Psoralen
- Cantharidin

== Uses of dermatoxic substances ==
Dermatotoxins have been used for several different substances, many of which are or have in the past been tied to cosmetics and similar industries. While there are many kinds of dermatoxins, used in a variety of chemical compounds, the below are a few examples.

One of the most well-known dermatoxic substances is sulfur mustard, or mustard gas, which has been known to cause damage to the skin, eyes, and lungs, which can escalate to blinding the victims. It is considered a blister agent, and has been known to be a carcinogenic substance. It has historically been used in warfare multiple times, beginning in World War I.

Psoralen is another dermatoxic substance, which is known to be photocarcinogenic, meaning it increases the risk of cancer when exposed to light. It could be found as an ingredient in tanning lotions until 1996, when it was discovered that it was a potential cause for an increase in melanoma rates and its use was subsequently banned by the European Commission.

Cantharidin, another known dermatoxin, is an ingredient used to treat some skin conditions, such as molluscum contagiosum, a kind of wart. However, it has been documented to have side effects, such as pain, blistering, itching, scabs, redness or other discoloration, dryness, edema or swelling, and general damage to the skin when it is applied topically.

== See also ==
- Vesicant
