= Aflatoxin B1 exo-8,9-epoxide =

Aflatoxin B_{1} exo-8,9-epoxide

Names
- Preferred IUPAC name (6aS,7aS,8aR,8bR)-4-Methoxy-2,3,6a,7a,8a,8b-hexahydrocyclopenta[c]oxireno[2′′,3′′:4′,5′]furo[3′,2′:4,5]furo[2,3-h][1]benzopyran-1,10-dione

Identifiers
| CAS Number | 42583-46-0 |
| 3D model (JSmol) | Interactive image |
| ChEBI | CHEBI:30725 |
| ChemSpider | 94566 |
| PubChem CID | 104756 |
| CompTox Dashboard (EPA) | DTXSID10920447 |
- InChI: InChI=1S/C17H12O7/c1-20-7-4-8-11(12-14-17(23-14)24-16(12)21-8)13-10(7)5-2-3-6(18)9(5)15(19)22-13/h4,12,14,16-17H,2-3H2,1H3/t12-,14-,16+,17+/m1/s1 Key: KHBXRZGALJGBPA-IRWJRLHMSA-N
- SMILES: COc1cc2c(c3c1c4c(c(=O)o3)C(=O)CC4)[C@@H]5[C@@H]6[C@@H](O6)O[C@@H]5O2

Properties
| Chemical formula | C_{17}H_{12}O_{7} |
| Molar mass | 328.276 g·mol^{−1} |
- Except where otherwise noted, data are given for materials in their standard state (at 25 °C [77 °F], 100 kPa). Infobox references

Aflatoxin B_{1} exo-8,9-epoxide is a toxic metabolite of aflatoxin B_{1}. It's formed by the action of cytochrome P450 enzymes in the liver.

In the liver, aflatoxin B_{1} is metabolized to aflatoxin B_{1} exo-8,9-epoxide by the cytochrome P450 enzymes. The resulting epoxide can react with guanine in the DNA to cause DNA damage.

== See also ==
- Aflatoxin B1
- Cytochrome P450
