= Aflatoxin B1 =

Aflatoxin B_{1}
- Chemical structure of (−)-aflatoxin B_{1}

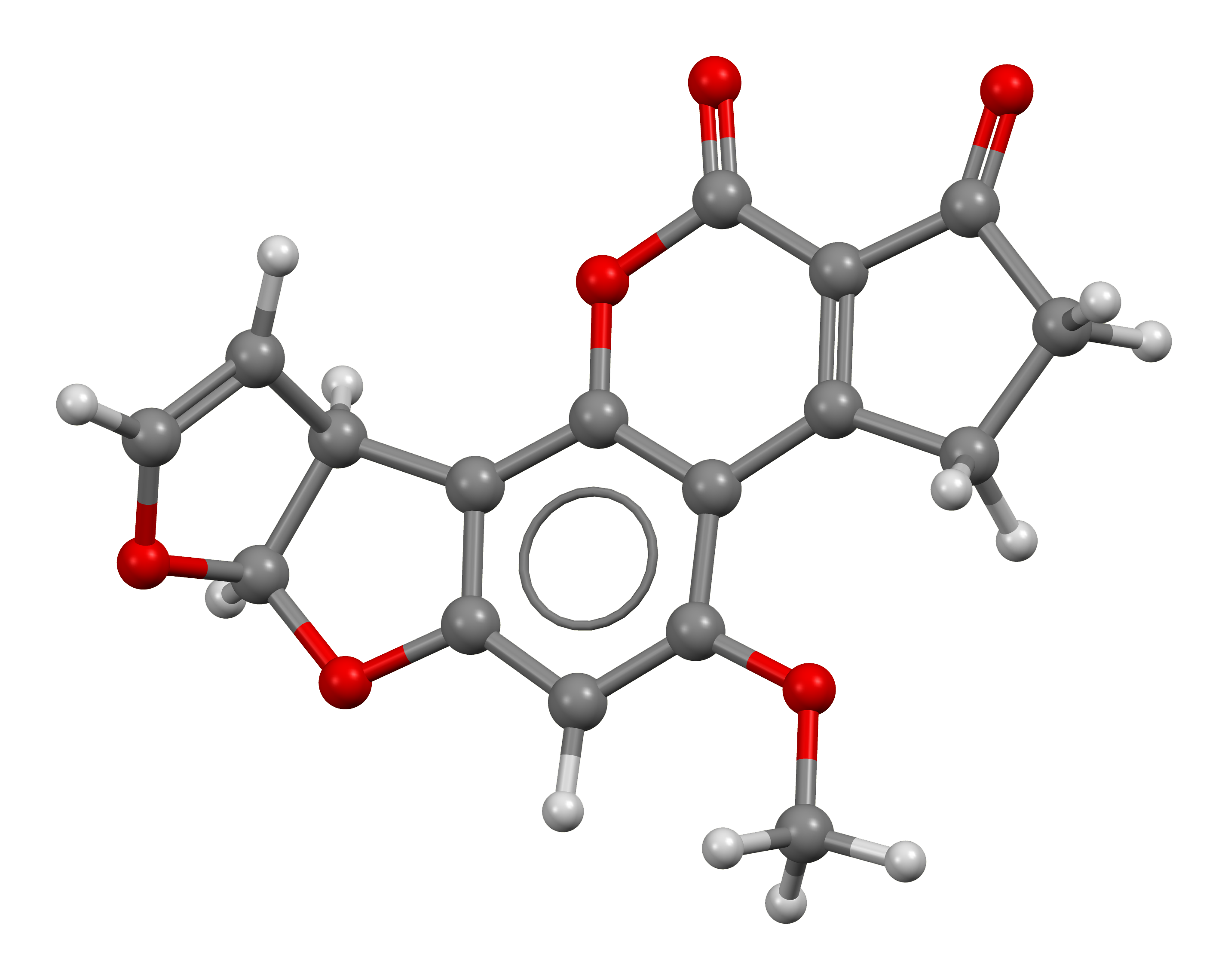
- Ball-and-stick model of aflatoxin B_{1}

Names
- Preferred IUPAC name (6aR,9aS)-4-Methoxy-2,3,6a,9a-tetrahydrocyclopenta[c]furo[3′,2′:4,5]furo[2,3-h][1]benzopyran-1,11-dione
- Other names NSC 529592

Identifiers
CAS Number	1162-65-8
3D model (JSmol)	Interactive image
ChEMBL	ChEMBL1697694
ChemSpider	13758
ECHA InfoCard	100.013.276
PubChem CID	14403
UNII	9N2N2Y55MH
CompTox Dashboard (EPA)	DTXSID00873175 DTXSID9020035, DTXSID00873175
- InChI: InChI=1S/C17H12O6/c1-20-10-6-11-14(8-4-5-21-17(8)22-11)15-13(10)7-2-3-9(18)12(7)16(19)23-15/h4-6,8,17H,2-3H2,1H3 Key: OQIQSTLJSLGHID-UHFFFAOYSA-N
- SMILES: O=C5C=4C(=O)Oc3c1c(OC2O\C=C/C12)cc(OC)c3C=4CC5

Properties
Chemical formula	C_{17}H_{12}O_{6}
Molar mass	312.277 g·mol^{−1}

Hazards
- Occupational safety and health (OHS/OSH)
Main hazards	Carcinogen – Mutagen – Acute toxicity / Poison
- GHS labelling
Pictograms	(GHS06: Toxic) (GHS08: Health hazard)
Signal word	Danger
Hazard statements	H300, H310, H330, H340, H350
Precautionary statements	P201, P202, P260, P262, P264, P270, P271, P280, P281, P284, P301+P330+P331, P302+P350, P304+P340, P308+P313, P310, P311, P320, P321, P330, P361, P363, P403+P233, P405, P501
- Except where otherwise noted, data are given for materials in their standard state (at 25 °C [77 °F], 100 kPa). verify (what is ?) Infobox references

Aflatoxin B_{1} is an aflatoxin produced by Aspergillus flavus and A. parasiticus. It is a very potent carcinogen with a TD_{50} 3.2 μg/kg/day in rats. This carcinogenic potency varies across species with some, such as rats and monkeys, seemingly much more susceptible than others. Aflatoxin B_{1} is a common contaminant in a variety of foods including peanuts, cottonseed meal, corn, and other grains; as well as animal feeds. Aflatoxin B_{1} is considered the most toxic aflatoxin and it is highly implicated in hepatocellular carcinoma (HCC) in humans. In animals, aflatoxin B_{1} has also been shown to be mutagenic, teratogenic, and to cause immunosuppression. Several sampling and analytical methods including thin-layer chromatography (TLC), high-performance liquid chromatography (HPLC), mass spectrometry, and enzyme-linked immunosorbent assay (ELISA), among others, have been used to test for aflatoxin B_{1} contamination in foods. According to the Food and Agriculture Organization (FAO), a division of the United Nations, the worldwide maximum tolerated levels of aflatoxin B_{1} was reported to be in the range of 1–20 μg/kg (or .001 ppm - 1 part-per-billion) in food, and 5–50 μg/kg (.005 ppm) in dietary cattle feed in 2003.

== Sources of exposure ==
Aflatoxin B_{1} is mostly found in contaminated food and humans are exposed to aflatoxin B_{1} almost entirely through their diet. Occupational exposure to aflatoxin B_{1} has also been reported in swine and poultry production. While aflatoxin B_{1} contamination is common in many staple foods, its production is maximized in foods stored in hot, humid climates. Exposure is therefore most common in Southeast Asia, South America, and Sub-Saharan Africa.

== Pathology ==
Aflatoxin B_{1} can permeate through the skin. Dermal exposure to this aflatoxin in particular environmental conditions can lead to major health risks. The liver is the most susceptible organ to aflatoxin B_{1} toxicity. Studies in mice demonstrate that Aflatoxin B1 induces oxidative stress in hepatic tissue, which activates mitochondrial-dependent apoptosis and triggers liver injury. In animal studies, pathological lesions associated with aflatoxin B_{1} intoxication include reduction in weight of liver, vacuolation of hepatocytes, and hepatic carcinoma. Other liver lesions include enlargement of hepatic cells, fatty infiltration, necrosis, hemorrhage, fibrosis, regeneration of nodules, and bile duct proliferation/hyperplasia.

== Aspergillus flavus ==
Aspergillus flavus is a fungus of the family Trichocomaceae with a worldwide distribution. The mold lives in soil, surviving off dead plant and animal matter, but spreads through the air via airborne conidia. This fungus grows in long branched hyphae and is capable of surviving on numerous food sources including corn and peanuts. Aspergillus species commonly cause disease in humans and other animals either through mycotoxicosis (poisoning) or through fungal infections. Aflatoxin B1 is a key contributor to the toxicity of foods contaminated with the fungus.

A. flavus is capable of parasitizing many host species. In humans, Aspergillus flavus along with Aspergillus fumigatus are common agents of fungal infections referred to as aspergillosis. These species primarily infect the lungs of immune-compromised patients, but A. flavus infections of the skin, eye, and other organs also occur. Unlike many mold species, Aspergillus flavus prefers hot and dry conditions; its optimal growth at 37 °C (99 °F) contributes to its pathogenicity in humans. Species that do not grow well at body temperature cannot typically infect humans.

== Biosynthetic pathway ==
Aflatoxin B_{1} is derived from both a dedicated fatty acid synthase (FAS) and a polyketide synthase (PKS), together known as norsolorinic acid synthase. The biosynthesis begins with the synthesis of hexanoate by the FAS, which then becomes the starter unit for the iterative type I PKS. The PKS adds seven malonyl-CoA extenders to the hexanoate to form the C20 polyketide compound. The PKS folds the polyketide in a particular way to induce cyclization to form the anthraquinone norsolorinic acid. A reductase then catalyzes the reduction of the ketone on the norsolorinic acid side-chain to yield averantin. Averantin is converted to averufin via a two different enzymes, a hydroxylase and an alcohol dehydrogenase. This will oxygenate and cyclize averantin's side chain to form the ketal in averufin.

From this point on the biosynthetic pathway of aflatoxin B_{1} becomes much more complicated, with several major skeletal changes. Most of the enzymes have not been characterized and there may be several more intermediates that are still unknown. However, what is known is that averufin is oxidized by a P450-oxidase, AvfA, in a Baeyer-Villiger oxidation. This opens the ether rings and upon rearrangement versiconal acetate is formed. Now an esterase, EstA, catalyzes the hydrolysis of the acetyl, forming the primary alcohol in versiconal. The acetal in versicolorin A is formed from the cyclization of the side-chain in versiconal, which is catalyzed by VERB synthase, and then VerB, a desaturase, reduces versicolorin B to form the dihydrobisfuran.

There are two more enzymes that catalyze the conversion of versicolorin A to demethylsterigmatocystin: AflN, an oxidase and AflM, a reductase. These enzymes use both molecular oxygen and two NADPH's to dehydrate one of the hydroxyl groups on the anthraquinone and open the quinine with the molecular oxygen. Upon forming the aldehyde in the ring opening step, it is oxidized to form the carboxylic acid and subsequently a decarboxylation event occurs to close the ring, forming the six-member ether ring system seen in demethylsterigmatocystin. The next two steps in the biosynthetic pathway is the methylation by S-adenosyl methionine (SAM) of the two hydroxyl groups on the xanthone part of demethysterigmatocystin by two different methyltransferases, OmtB and OmtA. This yields O-methylsterigmatocystin. In the final steps there is an oxidative cleavage of the aromatic ring and loss of one carbon in O-methylsterigmatocystin, which is catalyzed by OrdA, an oxidoreductase. Then a final recyclization occurs to form aflatoxin B_{1}.

== Mechanism of carcinogenicity ==
Aflatoxin B_{1} is a potent genotoxic hepatocarcinogen with its exposure strongly linked to the development of hepatocellular carcinoma, liver tumors, especially given co-infection with hepatitis B virus. These effects seem to be largely mediated by mutations at guanine in codon 249 of the p53 gene, a tumor suppressing gene, and at several guanine residues in the 12th and 13th codons of the ras gene, a gene whose product controls cellular proliferation signals. Aflatoxin B_{1} must first be metabolized into its reactive electrophilic form, aflatoxin B_{1}-8,9-exo-epoxide by cytochrome p450. This active form then intercalates between DNA base residues and forms adducts with guanine residues, most commonly aflatoxin B_{1}-N7-Gua. These adducts may then rearrange or become removed from the backbone altogether, forming an apurinic site. These adducts and alterations represent lesions which, upon DNA replication, cause the insertion of a mis-matched base in the opposing strand. Up to 44% of hepatocellular carcinomas in regions with high aflatoxin exposure bear a GC → TA transversion at codon 249 of p53, a characteristic mutation seen with this toxin.Aflatoxin B1 metabolism also creates lipid peroxidation, and the aldehydes made from lipid peroxidation (acetaldehyde and crotonaldehyde) make cyclic propano-deoxyguanosine adducts in DNA that were found at around 30 times more than epoxide-derived adducts and were concentrated at p53 codon 249.

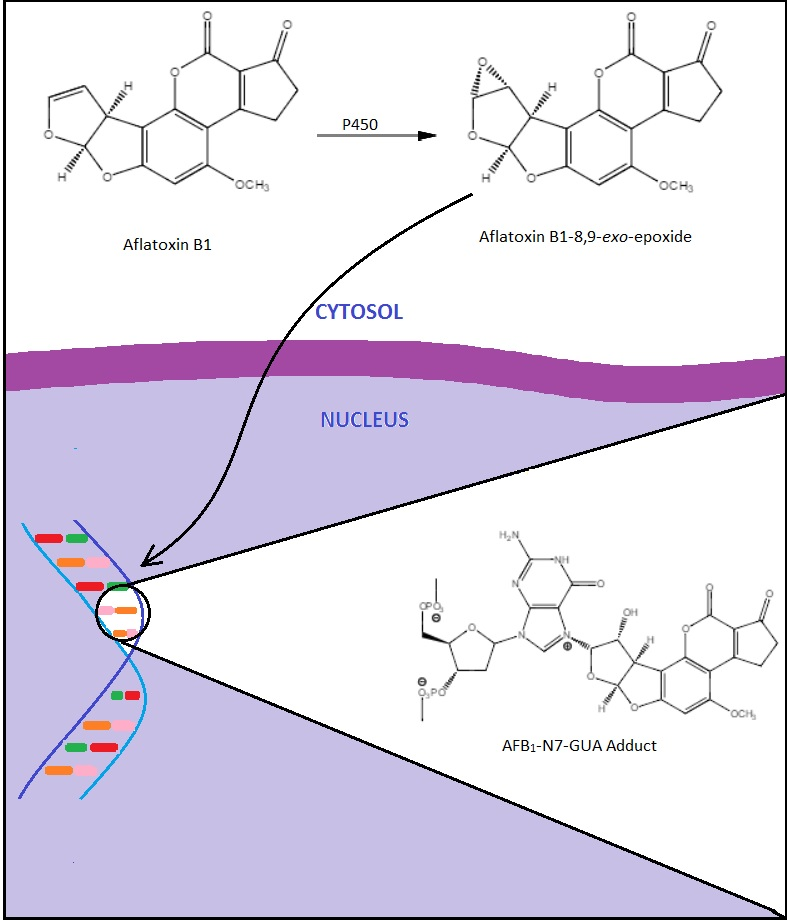
Adapted from Semela et al. 2001

Prevalence of hepatocellular carcinoma in individuals exposed to aflatoxin increases with co-infection of hepatitis B virus. One study estimated that while individuals with urinary aflatoxin bio-markers were at a threefold greater risk than the normal population for hepatocellular carcinoma; those infected with hepatitis B virus were at a fourfold risk; and those with the aflatoxin bio-markers and infected with hepatitis B virus were at a 60 times greater risk for hepatocellular carcinoma than the normal population.

== Toxicity ==
Several aflatoxin B_{1} toxicity studies have been conducted on various animal species.

Acute toxicity
The oral LD_{50} range of aflatoxin B_{1} is estimated to be 0.3–17.9 mg/kg body weight for most animal species. For instance, the oral LD_{50} of aflatoxin B_{1} is estimated to be 17.9 mg/kg body weight in female rats and 7.2 mg/kg body weight in male rats. Still in male rats, the intraperitoneal LD_{50} of aflatoxin B_{1} is estimated to be 6.0 mg/kg body weight. Symptoms include anorexia, malaise, and low-grade fever.

Subacute toxicity
Subacute toxicity studies of aflatoxin B_{1} in animals showed moderate to severe liver damage. In monkeys for instance, subacute toxicity studies showed portal inflammation and fatty change.
Chronic toxicity
Chronic toxicity studies of aflatoxin B_{1} in chickens showed decreased hepatic microsomal cytochrome P-450 concentration, reduction in feed consumption and decreased weight gain.

Subchronic toxicity
Subchronic toxicity studies of aflatoxin B_{1} in fish showed fish to present with preneoplastic lesions, concurrently with changes in gill, pancreas, intestine and spleen.

Genotoxicity
Treatment of human liver cells with aflatoxin B_{1} at doses that ranged from 3–5 μmol/L resulted in the formation of aflatoxin B_{1}-DNA adducts, 8-hydroxyguanine lesions and DNA damage.

Carcinogenicity
The carcinogenicity of aflatoxin B_{1}, which is characterized by the development of liver cell carcinoma, has been reported in rat studies.

Embryotoxicity
Embryonic death and impaired embryonic development of the bursa of Fabricius in chickens by aflatoxin B_{1} has been reported.

Teratogenicity
The teratogenic effects of aflatoxin B_{1} in rabbits have been reported to include reduced fetal weights, wrist drop, enlarged eye socket, agenesis of caudal vertebrae, micropthalmia, cardiac defects, and lenticular degeneration, among others.

Immunotoxicity
Studies in fish showed aflatoxin B_{1} to have significant immunosuppressive effects including reduced serum total globulin and reduced bactericidal activities. Additionally, in a study of broiler chickens, dietary aflatoxin B1 exposure increased apoptosis in splenic lymphocytes and oxidative stress, as indicated by reduced antioxidant enzyme activities and increased malondialdehyde concentrations.

== Risk management and regulations ==
Aflatoxin B_{1} exposure is best managed by measures aimed at preventing contamination of crops in the field, post-harvest handling, and storage, or via measures aimed at detecting and decontaminating contaminated commodities or materials used in animal feed. For instance, biological decontamination involving the use of a single bacterial species, Flavobacterium aurantiacum has been used to remove aflatoxin B_{1} from peanuts and corn.

Several countries around the world have rules and regulations governing aflatoxin B_{1} in foods and these include the maximum permitted, or recommended levels of aflatoxin B_{1} for certain foods.

United States (US)
US food safety regulations have set a maximum permitted level of 20 μg/kg for aflatoxin B_{1}, in combination with the other aflatoxins (B_{2}, G_{1} and G_{2}) in all foods, with the exception of milk which has a maximum permitted level of 0.5 μg/kg. Higher levels of 100–300 μg/kg are tolerable for some animal feeds.

European Union (EU)
The EU has set maximum permitted levels for aflatoxin B_{1} in nuts, dried fruits, cereals and spices to range from 2–12 μg/kg, while the maximum permitted level for aflatoxin B_{1} in infant foods is set at 0.1 μg/kg. The maximum permitted levels for aflatoxin B_{1} in animal feeds set by the EU range from 5–50 μg/kg and these levels are much lower than those set in the US.

Joint United Nations' Food and Agriculture Organization (FAO)/World Health Organization (WHO) Expert Committee on Food Additives (JECFA)
The FAO/WHO JECFA has set the maximum permitted levels of aflatoxin B_{1} in combination with the other aflatoxins (B_{2}, G_{1} and G_{2}) to be 15 μg/kg in raw peanuts and 10 μg/kg in processed peanuts; while the tolerance level of aflatoxin B_{1} alone is 5 μg/kg for dairy cattle feed.

== Notable exposures ==
The discovery of aflatoxin B_{1} came on the heels of the widespread death of turkeys in England in the summer of 1960 to some unknown disease, at the time labeled "Disease X". Over the course of 500 outbreaks, the disease claimed over 100,000 turkeys which appeared to be healthy. The widespread death was later found to be caused by Aspergillus flavus contamination of peanut meal.

Twelve patients died of acute aflatoxin poisoning in several hospitals in the Machakos district of Kenya in 1981 following the consumption of contaminated maize. All patients also suffered from hepatitis.

Following outbreaks of aflatoxin contamination in maize reaching 4,400 ppb in the spring of 2004, 125 individuals in Kenya died of acute hepatic failure while some 317 cases in total were reported. To date this was the largest known outbreak of aflatoxicosis in terms of fatalities documented.
