= Sterigmatocystin =

Names
- Preferred IUPAC name (3aR,12cS)-8-Hydroxy-6-methoxy-3a,12c-dihydro-7H-furo[3′,2′:4,5]furo[2,3-c]xanthen-7-one
- Other names Sterigmatocystin

Identifiers
CAS Number	10048-13-2
3D model (JSmol)	Interactive image
ChEBI	CHEBI:18227
ChEMBL	ChEMBL524291
ChemSpider	4447522
ECHA InfoCard	100.030.131
EC Number	233-158-6
KEGG	C00961
PubChem CID	5280389
UNII	5F95211S5Z
CompTox Dashboard (EPA)	DTXSID2021280
- InChI: InChI=1S/C18H12O6/c1-21-11-7-12-13(8-5-6-22-18(8)24-12)17-15(11)16(20)14-9(19)3-2-4-10(14)23-17/h2-8,18-19H,1H3/t8-,18+/m0/s1 Key: UTSVPXMQSFGQTM-DCXZOGHSSA-N
- SMILES: COC1=C2C(=C3[C@@H]4C=CO[C@@H]4OC3=C1)OC5=C(C2=O)C(=CC=C5)O

Properties
Chemical formula	C_{18}H_{12}O_{6}
Molar mass	324.28 g/mol
- Except where otherwise noted, data are given for materials in their standard state (at 25 °C [77 °F], 100 kPa). verify (what is ?) Infobox references

Sterigmatocystin is a polyketide mycotoxin produced by certain species of Aspergillus. The toxin is naturally found in some cheeses.

Sterigmatocystin is a toxic metabolite structurally closely related to the aflatoxins as it is the penultimate precursor of aflatoxins B1 and G1. It contains a xanthone nucleus attached to a bifuran structure. Sterigmatocystin is mainly produced by the fungi Aspergillus nidulans and A. versicolor.

It has been reported in mouldy grain, green coffee beans and cheese although information on its occurrence in foods is limited. It appears to occur much less frequently than the aflatoxins, although analytical methods for its determination have not been as sensitive, and so it is possible that small concentrations in food commodities may not always have been detected. Although it is a potent liver carcinogen similar to aflatoxin B1, current knowledge suggests that it is nowhere near as widespread in its occurrence. If this is the true situation it would be justified to consider sterigmatocystin as no more than a risk to consumers in special or unusual circumstances. A number of closely related compounds such as o-methyl sterigmatocystin are known, and some may also occur naturally.

== Chemical and physical properties ==
Sterigmatocystin forms pale yellow needles and that are readily soluble in methanol, ethanol, acetonitrile, benzene, and chloroform. Sterigmatocystin reacts with a hot solution of potassium hydroxide and ethanol and is easily methylated by methyl iodide. Treatment with ethanol in acid produces dihydroethoxysterigmatocystin.

== Toxicity and importance ==
The toxic effects of sterigmatocystin are much the same as those of aflatoxin B1. It is thus considered as a potent carcinogen, mutagen, and teratogen. It is less acutely toxic to rodents and monkeys but appears to be slightly more toxic to zebra fish. The LD50 in mice is in excess of 800 mg/kg. The 10-day LD50 in Wistar rats is 166 mg/kg in males, 120 mg/kg in females, and 60–65 mg/kg for ip. administration in males. The ip. 10-day LD50 for vervet monkeys is 32 mg/kg.

Chronic symptoms include induction of hepatomas in rats, pulmonary tumours in mice, renal lesions and alterations in the liver and kidneys of African Green monkeys. Rats fed 5–10 mg/kg of sterigmatocystin for two years showed a 90% incidence of liver tumours. It has been suggested that sterigmatocystin is about 1/10 as potent a carcinogen as aflatoxin B1.

Toxic effects of sterigmatocystin-fed laboratory animals have included kidney and liver damage and diarrhoea. Skin and hepatic tumours are induced in rats by dermal application. Cattle exhibiting bloody diarrhoea, loss of milk production and in some cases death were found to have ingested feed containing Aspergillus versicolor and high levels of sterigmatocystin of about 8 mg/kg. The acute toxicity, carcinogenicity, and metabolism of sterigmatocystin has been compared with those for aflatoxin and several other hepatotoxic mycotoxins.

The IARC-classification of sterigmatocystin is group 2B, which means it is carcinogenic in other species and is possibly carcinogenic to humans, but that a definitive link between human exposure and cancer has not been proven.

Because sterigmatocystin (ST) is an intermediate of the aflatoxin biosynthesis pathway and is produced by the BSL-1 organism Aspergillus nidulans, it serves as a model for studying regulation of the aflatoxin biosynthetic gene cluster (BGC). Sterigmatocystin was shown to be produced only in the absence of glucose (carbon catabolite repression) but independent of CreA when glucose is used as sole carbon source. Instead, it was shown to be dependent on a regulator of G_{0} which transmits the glucose signal to downstream targets.

== Natural occurrence ==
The occurrence of sterigmatocystin in raw materials and foods has not been reported often. The instances reported have usually been on mouldy, or poor quality materials such as wheat, maize, animal feed, hard cheese, pecan nuts and green coffee beans. While this lack of information may be due to deficiencies in the analytical methods, where surveys of good quality products have been carried out with reliable methodology, sterigmatocystin has rarely if ever been found. However, further assurance is required before sterigmatocystin can finally be dismissed as a risk because A. versicolor has been isolated frequently from cereals, grain products, fruits and marmalade, dried meat products and grapefruit juice. Relatively high levels of sterigmatocystin have been formed in bread, cured ham and salami after inoculation with A. versicolor. More than in food, sterigmatocystin is frequently found in water-damaged buildings.

== Sampling and analysis ==
Methods for extraction of sterigmatocystin have been commonly based on a mixture of acetonitrile and 4% aqueous potassium chloride. Methods for detection using TLC are not very sensitive having a limit of detection in the range 20-50 microgrammes/kg. TLC plates must be sprayed with aluminium chloride and heated. Analytical methods for the determination of sterigmatocystin have been reported using HPLC but again these are not very sensitive because of lack of UV absorbance or fluorescence, although a post column reaction with aluminium chloride has been used to increase sensitivity. Methods using HPLC linked with atmospheric pressure ionisation mass spectrometric detection have been developed for foods such as cheese, bread and corn products.

== Stability and Persistence ==
There appear to be no reports about the stability of sterigmatocystin, other than in solution, where it is similar to the aflatoxins. There is one report that phosphine gas significantly depresses the formation of sterigmatocystin when cereals are inoculated with A. versicolor.

== Legislation and control ==
No country has legislation for sterigmatocystin. Natural occurrence appears to be infrequent although only a limited number of surveys have been carried out. Soon after it was recognised as a highly toxic compound, the California Department of Health Services used TD50 values from the Cancer Potency Database to produce 'no significant risk' intake levels for humans. The level resulting was 8 microgrammes/kg body weight/day for a 70 kg adult

== See also ==
- Dermatoxin
- Mycotoxin
