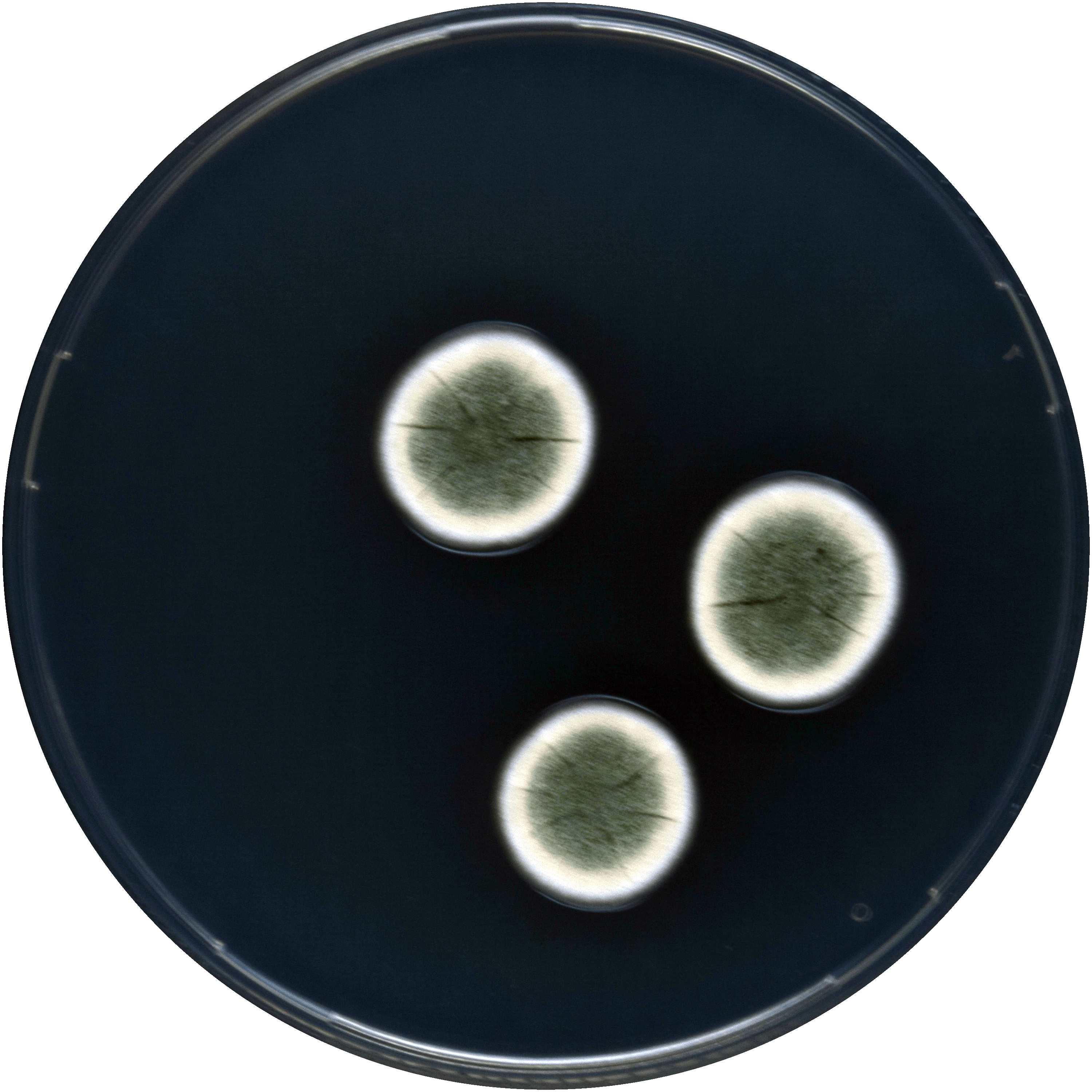
- Aspergillus tennesseensis

Scientific classification
- Kingdom: Fungi
- Division: Ascomycota
- Class: Eurotiomycetes
- Order: Eurotiales
- Family: Aspergillaceae
- Genus: Aspergillus
- Species: A. tennesseensis

Binomial name
- Aspergillus tennesseensis Jurjević, S.W. Peterson & B.W. Horn (2012)

= Aspergillus tennesseensis =

Species of fungus

Aspergillus tennesseensis is a species of fungus in the genus Aspergillus. It is from the Versicolores section. The species was first described in 2012.

== Growth and morphology ==
A. tennesseensis has been cultivated on both Czapek yeast extract agar (CYA) plates and malt extract agar oxoid plates.

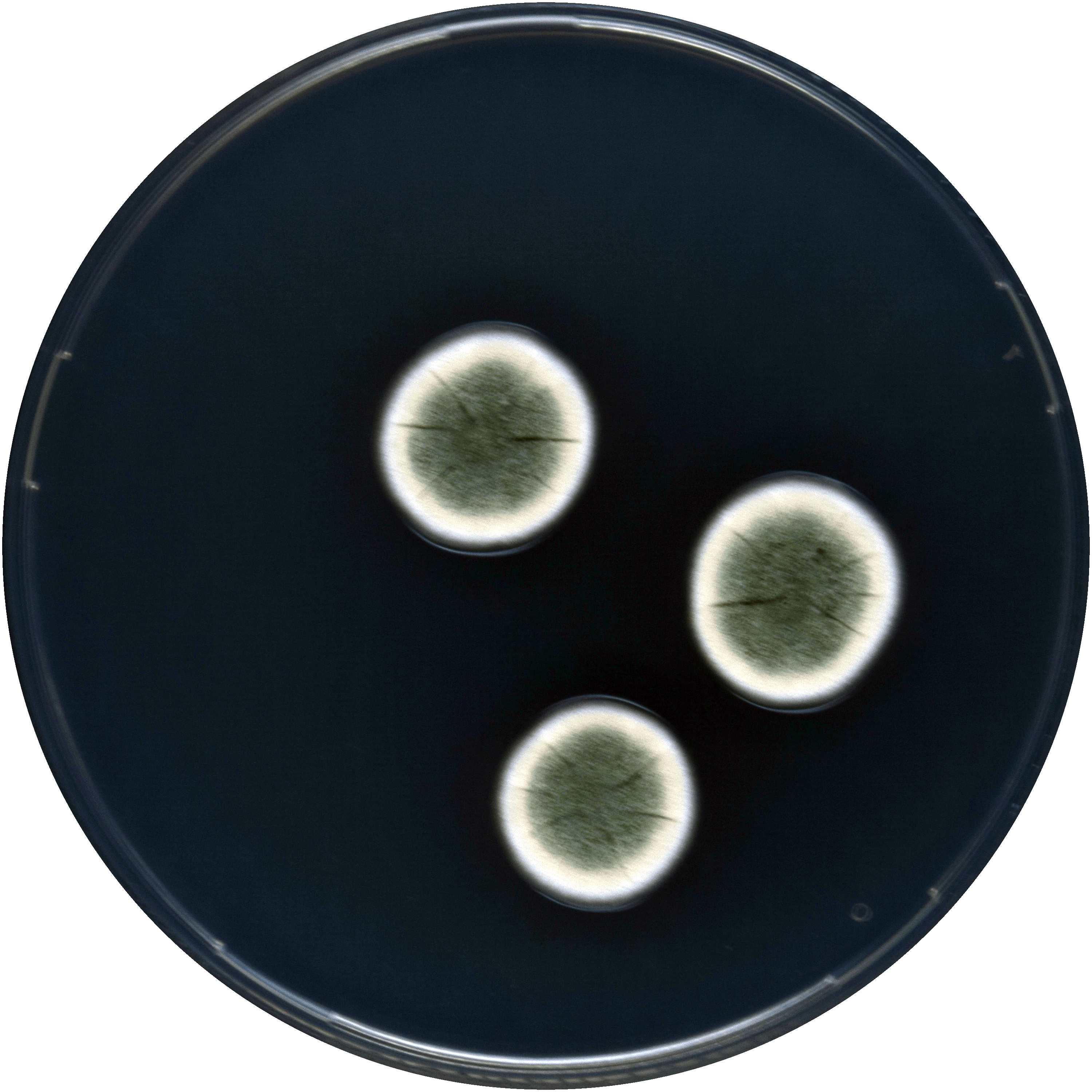
Aspergillus tennesseensis growing on CYA plate

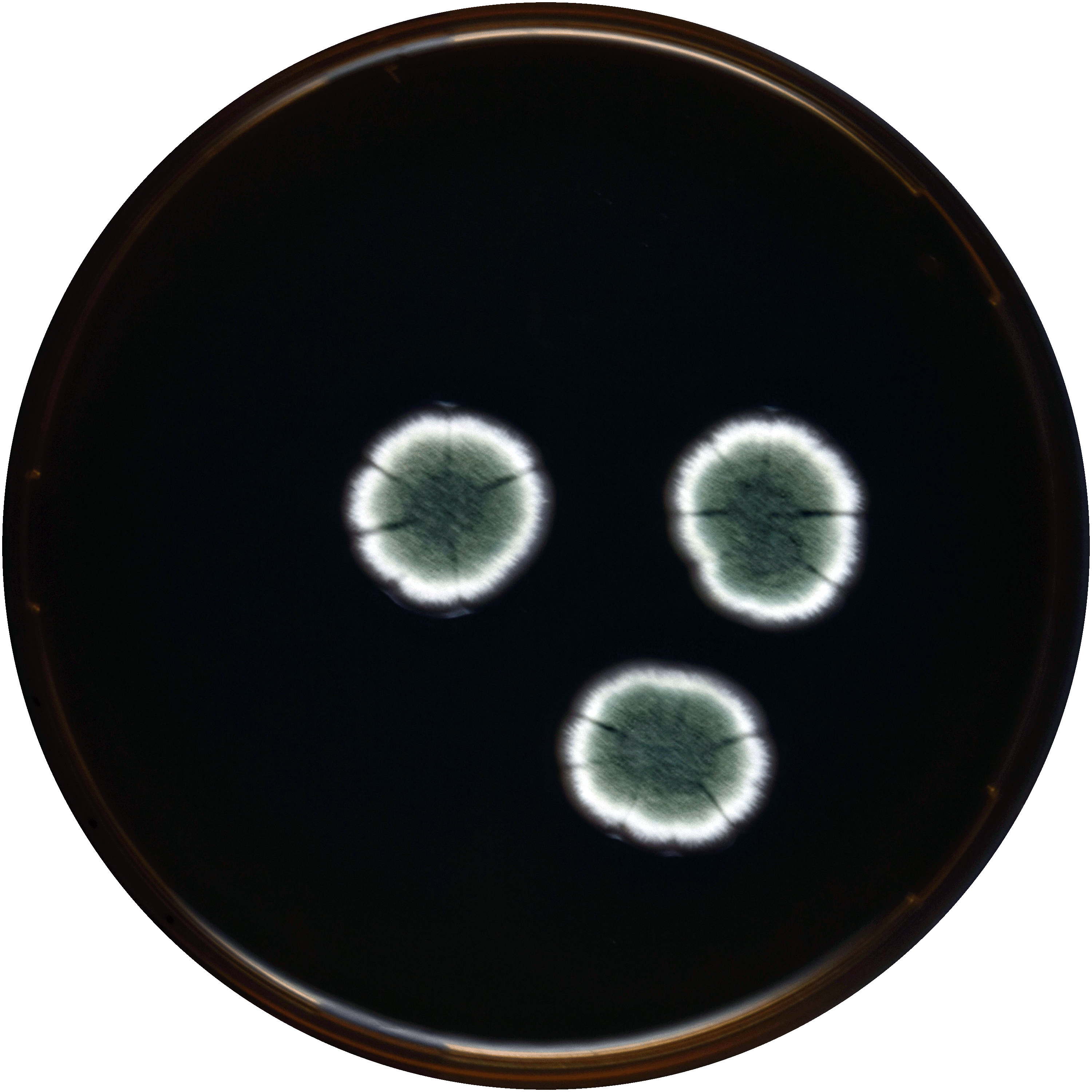
Aspergillus tennesseensis growing on MEAOX plate
