= Aspergillus undulatus =

Scientific classification
- Kingdom: Fungi
- Division: Ascomycota
- Class: Eurotiomycetes
- Order: Eurotiales
- Family: Aspergillaceae
- Genus: Aspergillus
- Species: A. undulatus

Binomial name
- Aspergillus undulatus H.Z. Kong & Z.T. Qi (1985)

Species of fungus

Aspergillus undulatus is a species of fungus in the genus Aspergillus. It is from the Nidulantes section. The species was first described in 1985. A. undulatus has been isolated in China and Germany.

In 2016, the genome of A. undulatus was sequenced as a part of the Aspergillus whole-genome sequencing project - a project dedicated to performing whole-genome sequencing of all members of the genus Aspergillus. The genome assembly size was 32.11 Mbp.

== Growth and morphology ==
Aspergillus undulatus has been cultivated on both Czapek yeast extract agar (CYA) plates and Malt Extract Agar Oxoid (MEAOX) plates. The growth morphology of the colonies can be seen in the pictures below.

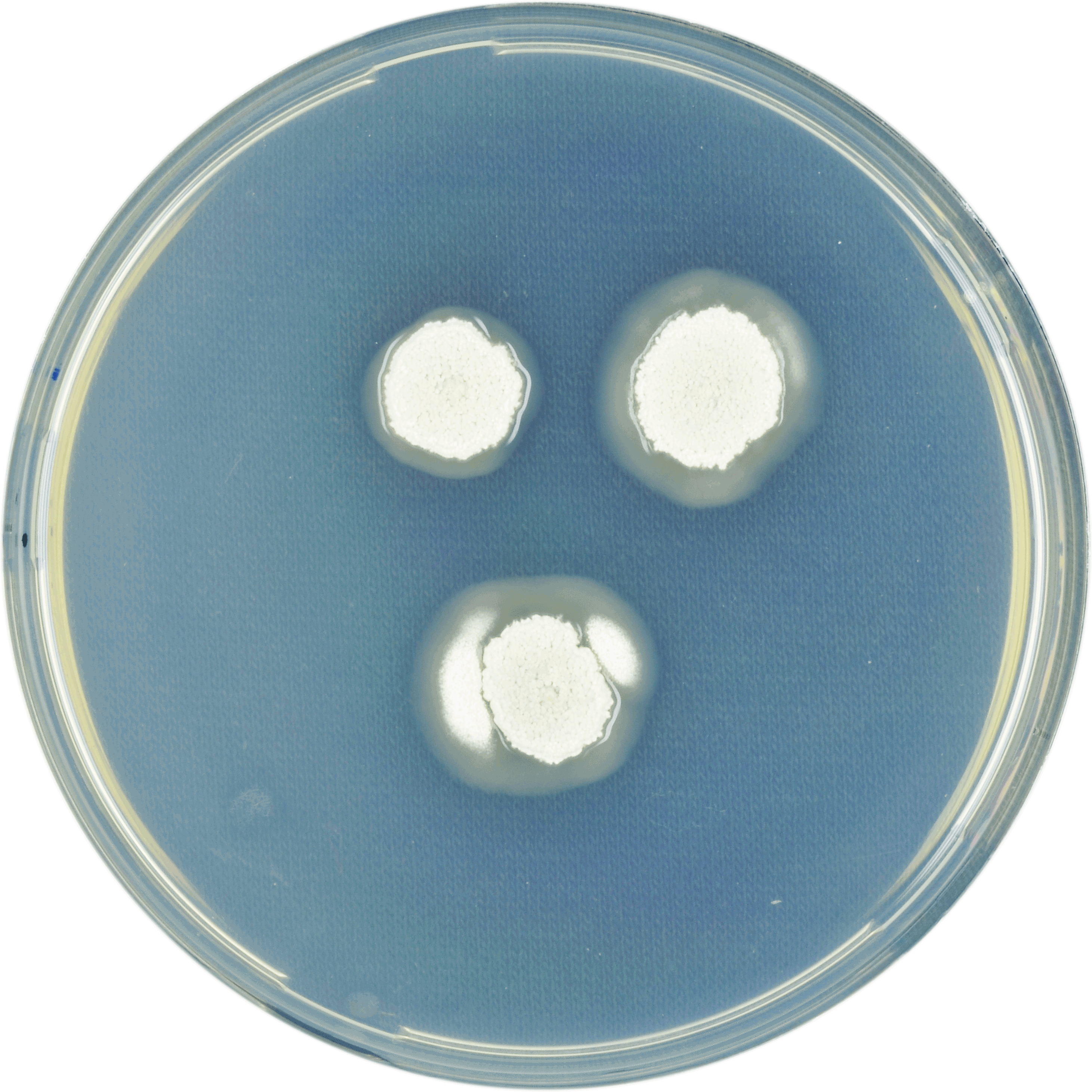
Aspergillus undulatus growing on CYA plate

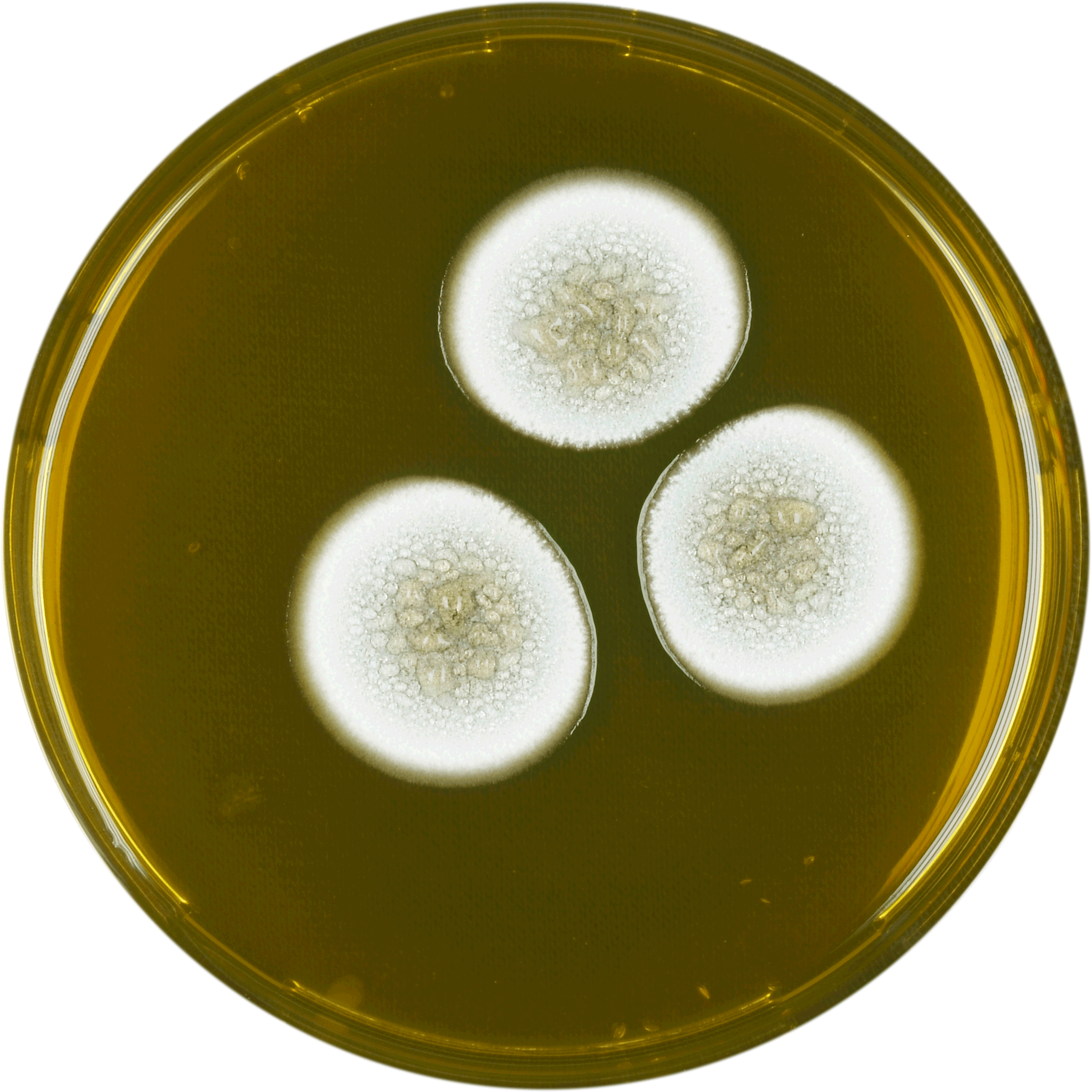
Aspergillus undulatus growing on MEAOX plate
