= Aspergillus askiburgiensis =

Scientific classification
- Kingdom: Fungi
- Division: Ascomycota
- Class: Eurotiomycetes
- Order: Eurotiales
- Family: Aspergillaceae
- Genus: Aspergillus
- Species: A. askiburgiensis

Binomial name
- Aspergillus askiburgiensis A. Nováková, Hubka, Frisvad, S.W. Peterson, M. Kolařík (2016)

Species of fungus

Aspergillus askiburgiensis is a species of fungus in the genus Aspergillus. It is from the Nidulantes section. The species was first described in 2016. It has been isolated from cave sediment in the Czech Republic. A. askiburgiensis has been reported to produce sterigmatocystin, versicolorins, and cf. monascorubramin.

== Growth and morphology ==
A. askiburgiensis has been cultivated on both Czapek yeast extract agar (CYA) plates and Malt Extract Agar Oxoid® (MEAOX) plates. The growth morphology of the colonies can be seen in the pictures below.

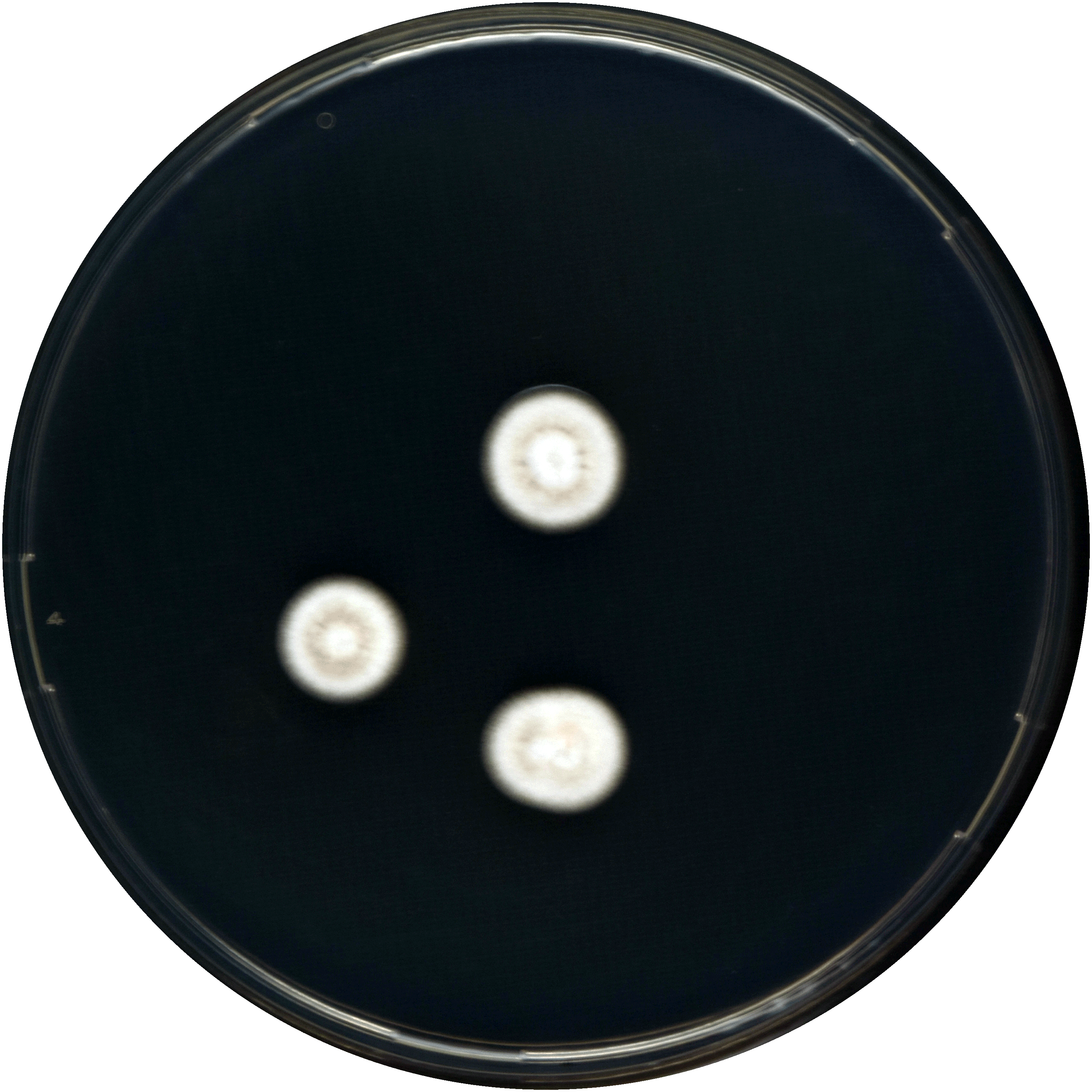
Aspergillus askiburgiensis growing on CYA plate

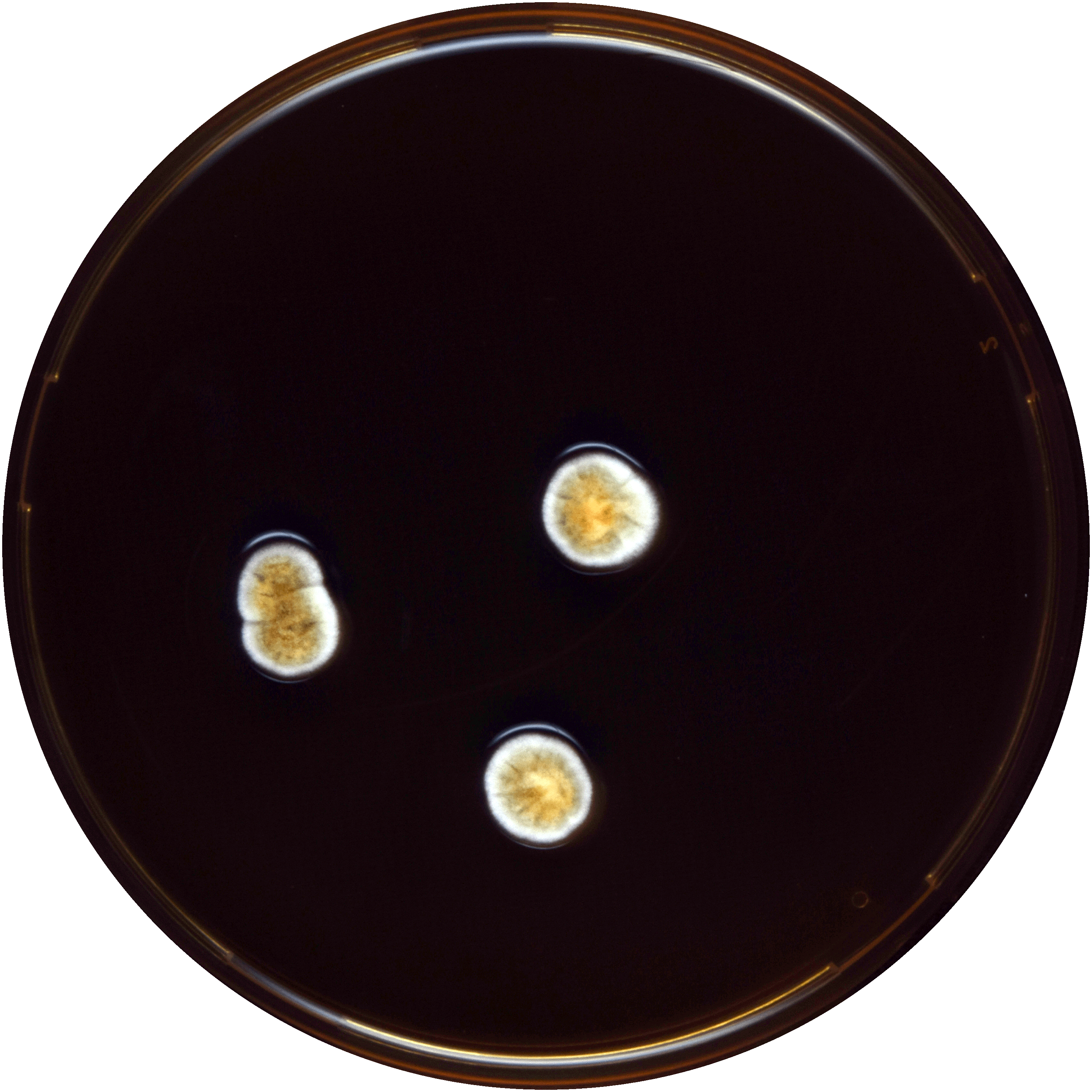
Aspergillus askiburgiensis growing on MEAOX plate
