= Aspergillus recurvatus =

Scientific classification
- Kingdom: Fungi
- Division: Ascomycota
- Class: Eurotiomycetes
- Order: Eurotiales
- Family: Aspergillaceae
- Genus: Aspergillus
- Species: A. recurvatus

Binomial name
- Aspergillus recurvatus Raper & Fennell (1965)

Species of fungus

Aspergillus recurvatus is a species of fungus in the genus Aspergillus. It is from the Nidulantes section. The species was first described in 1965.

In 2016, the genome of A. recurvatus was sequenced as a part of the Aspergillus whole-genome sequencing project - a project dedicated to performing whole-genome sequencing of all members of the genus Aspergillus. The genome assembly size was 30.72 Mbp.

== Growth and morphology ==
Aspergillus recurvatus has been cultivated on both Czapek yeast extract agar (CYA) plates and Malt Extract Agar Oxoid (MEAOX) plates. The growth morphology of the colonies can be seen in the pictures below.

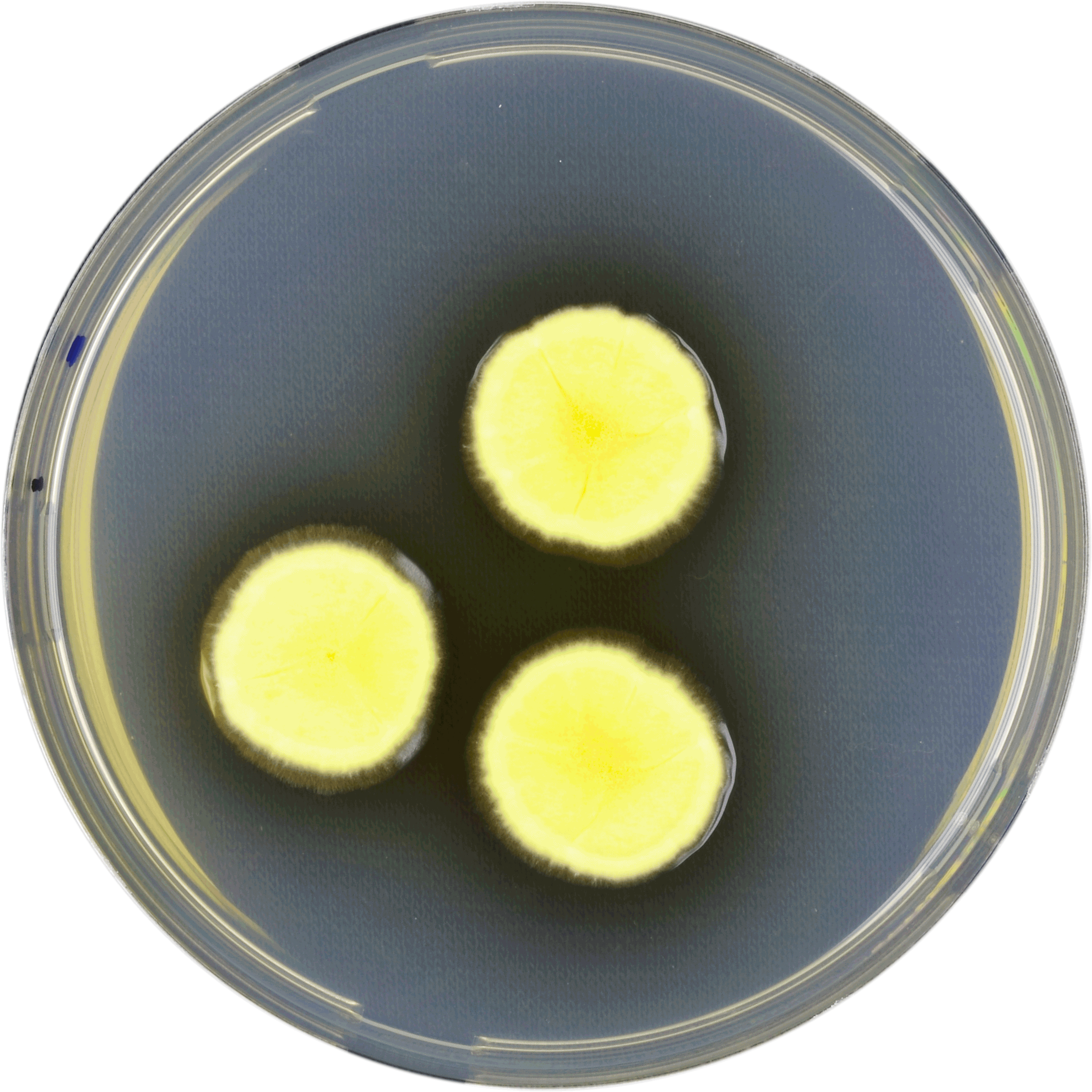
Aspergillus recurvatus growing on CYA plate

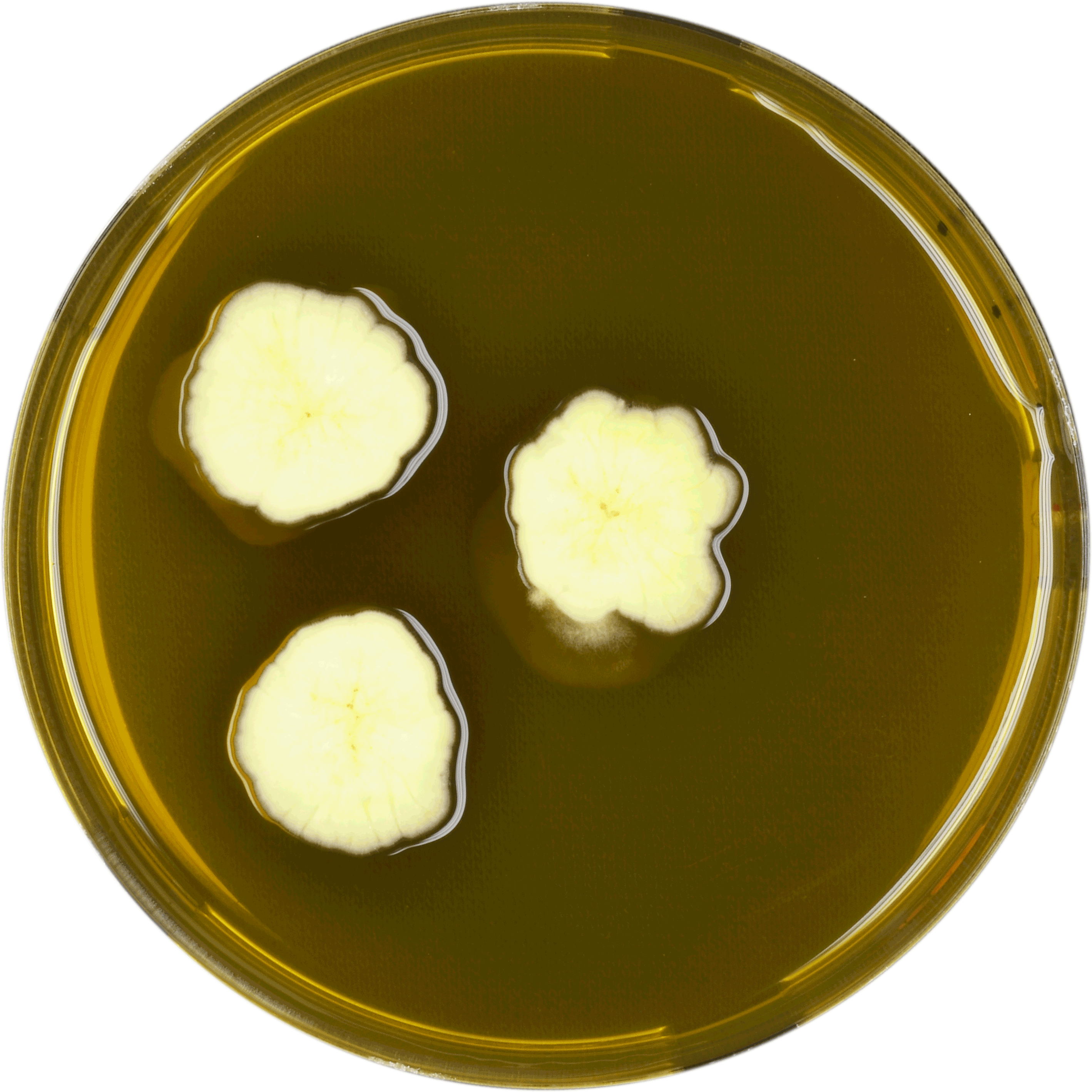
Aspergillus recurvatus growing on MEAOX plate
