= Aspergillus miraensis =

Scientific classification
- Kingdom: Fungi
- Division: Ascomycota
- Class: Eurotiomycetes
- Order: Eurotiales
- Family: Aspergillaceae
- Genus: Aspergillus
- Species: A. miraensis

Binomial name
- Aspergillus miraensis (L.C. Zhang, Juan Chen & S.X. Guo) Hubka, S.W. Peterson & M. Kolařík (2016)

Species of fungus

Aspergillus miraensis is a species of fungus in the genus Aspergillus. It is from the Nidulantes section. The species was first described in 2016. It has been isolated from roots of Polygonum macrophyllum var. stenophyllum, in Tibet, China. It has been reported to produce aflatoxin B1.

== Growth and morphology ==
A. miraensis has been cultivated on both Czapek yeast extract agar (CYA) plates and Malt Extract Agar Oxoid® (MEAOX) plates. The growth morphology of the colonies can be seen in the pictures below.

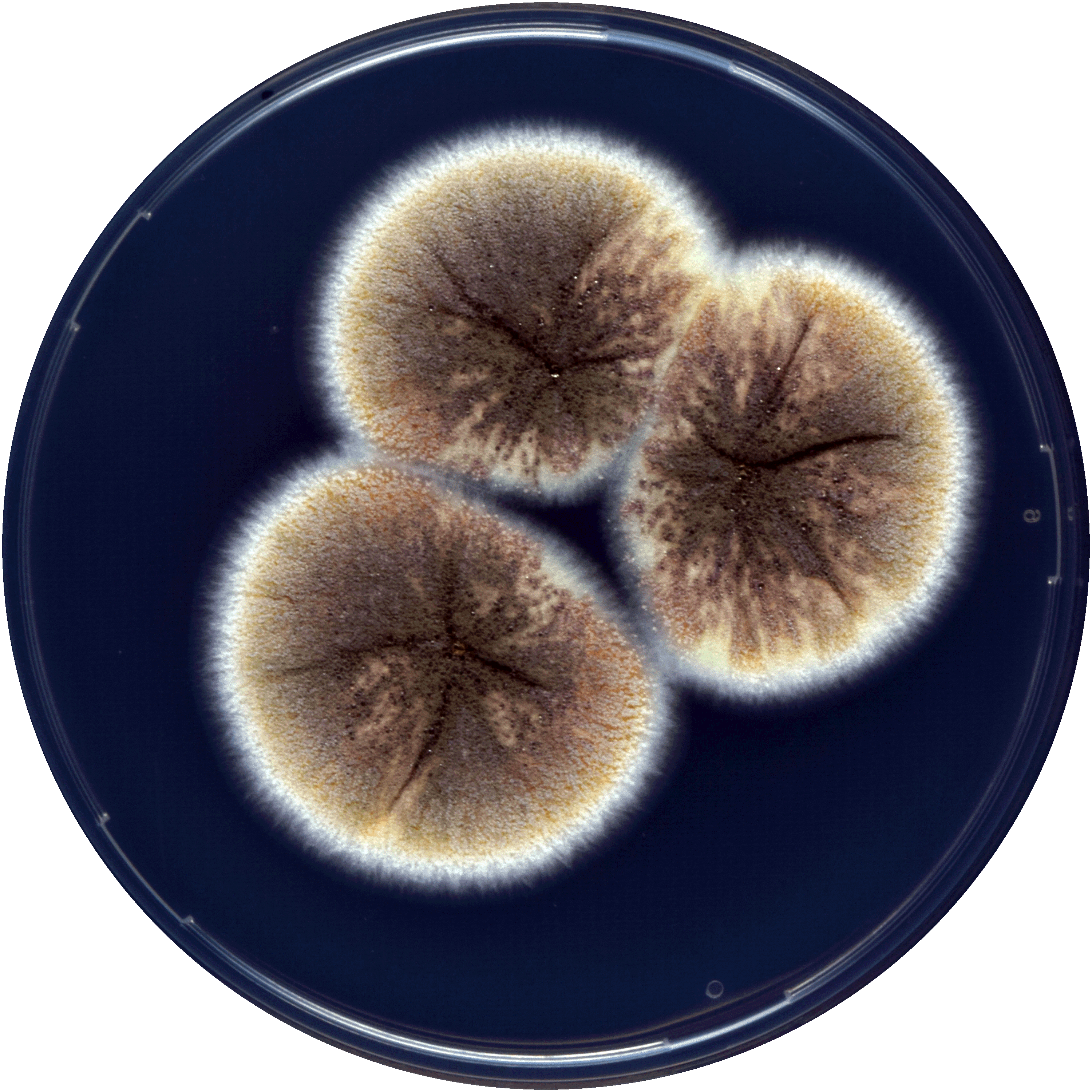
Aspergillus miraensis growing on CYA plate

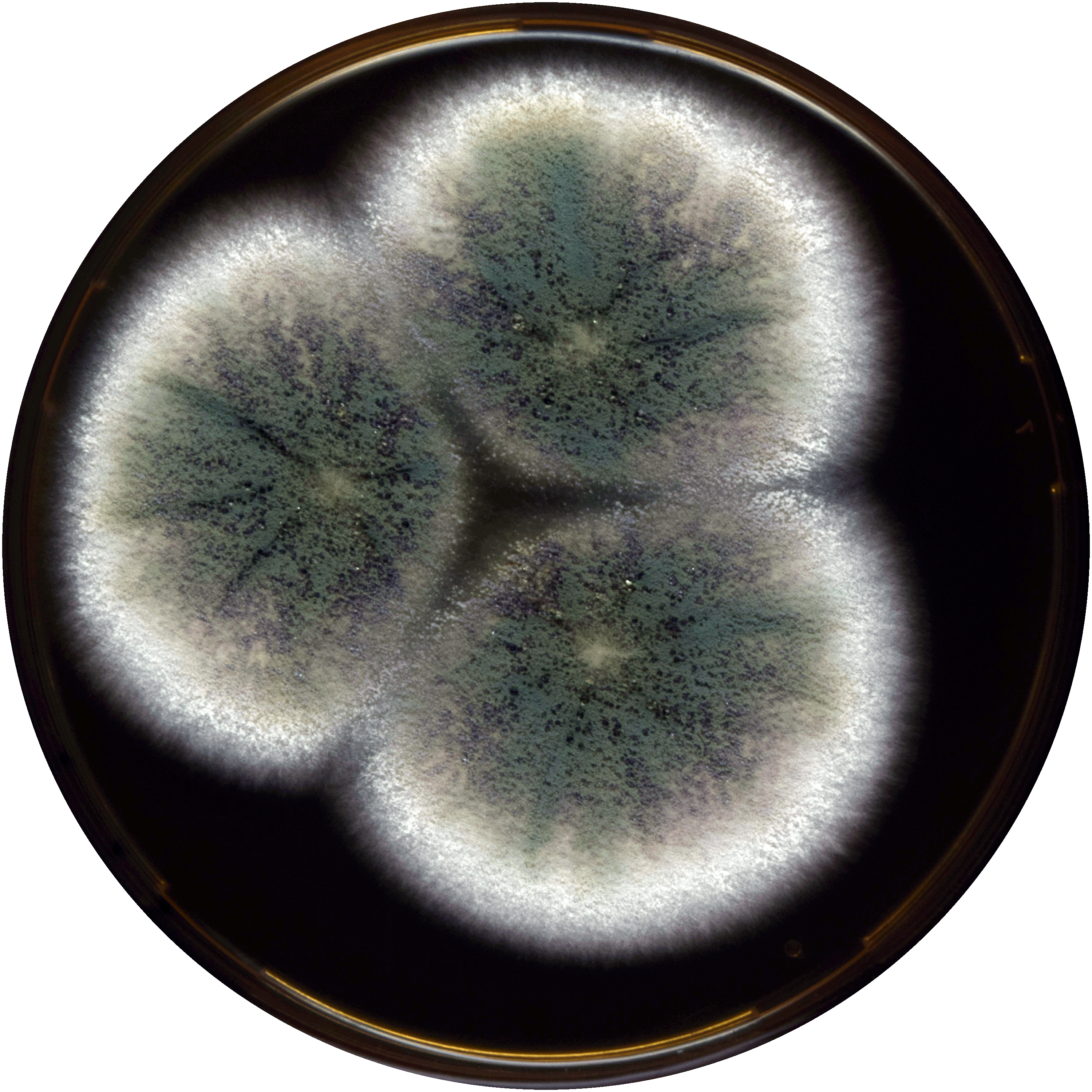
Aspergillus miraensis growing on MEAOX plate
