= Aspergillus keveii =

Scientific classification
- Kingdom: Fungi
- Division: Ascomycota
- Class: Eurotiomycetes
- Order: Eurotiales
- Family: Aspergillaceae
- Genus: Aspergillus
- Species: A. keveii

Binomial name
- Aspergillus keveii Varga, Frisvad & Samson (2007)

Type strain
- CBS 209.92

Species of fungus

Aspergillus keveii is a species of fungus in the genus Aspergillus which has been isolated from soil from Las Palmas in Spain. It is from the Usti section. It has been reported to produce drimans, ophiobolins G and H, and nidulol.

== Growth and morphology ==
A. keveii has been cultivated on both Czapek yeast extract agar (CYA) plates and Malt Extract Agar Oxoid® (MEAOX) plates. The growth morphology of the colonies can be seen in the pictures below.

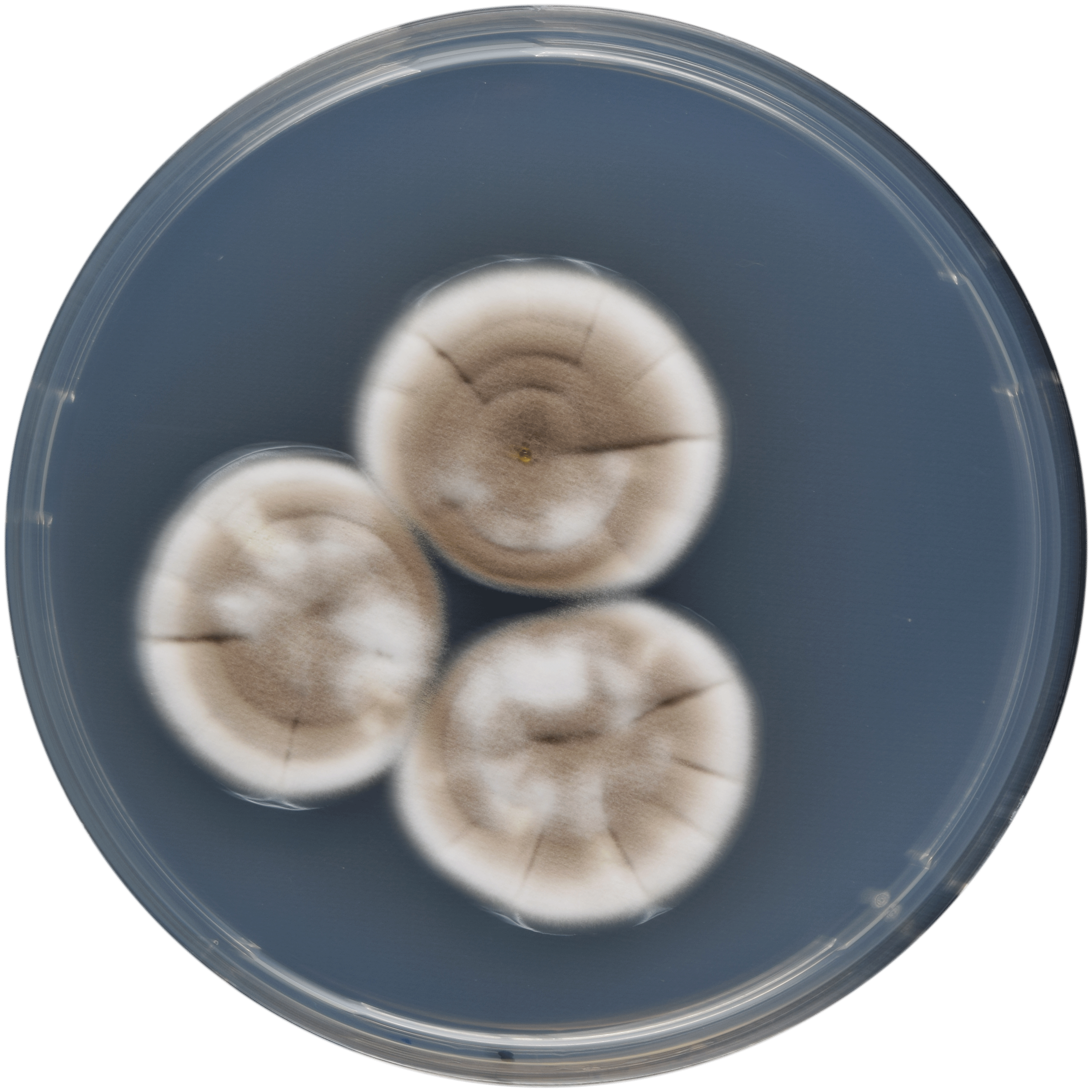
Aspergillus keveii growing on CYA plate

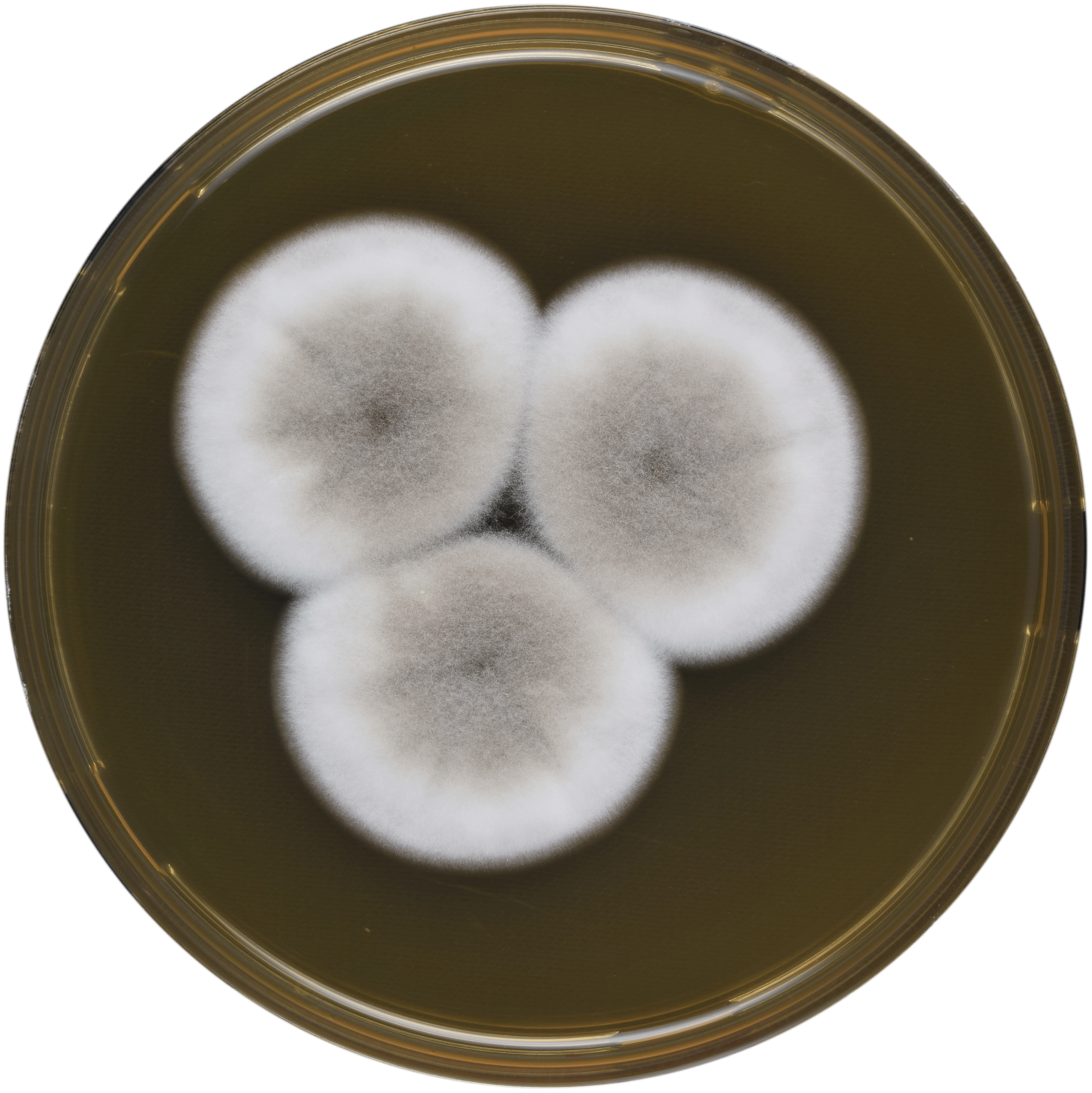
Aspergillus keveii growing on MEAOX plate
