= Aspergillus karnatakaensis =

Scientific classification
- Kingdom: Fungi
- Division: Ascomycota
- Class: Eurotiomycetes
- Order: Eurotiales
- Family: Aspergillaceae
- Genus: Aspergillus
- Species: A. karnatakaensis

Binomial name
- Aspergillus karnatakaensis Varga, Frisvad & Samson (2010)

Species of fungus

Aspergillus karnatakaensis is a species of fungus in the genus Aspergillus. It is from the Aenei section. The species was first described in 2010. A. karnatakaensis has been isolated from soil, and has been found to produce terrein, gregatins, asteltoxin, karnatakafuran A, and karnatakafuran B.

== Growth and morphology ==
A. karnatakaensis has been cultivated on both Czapek yeast extract agar (CYA) plates and Malt Extract Agar Oxoid® (MEAOX) plates. The growth morphology of the colonies can be seen in the pictures below.

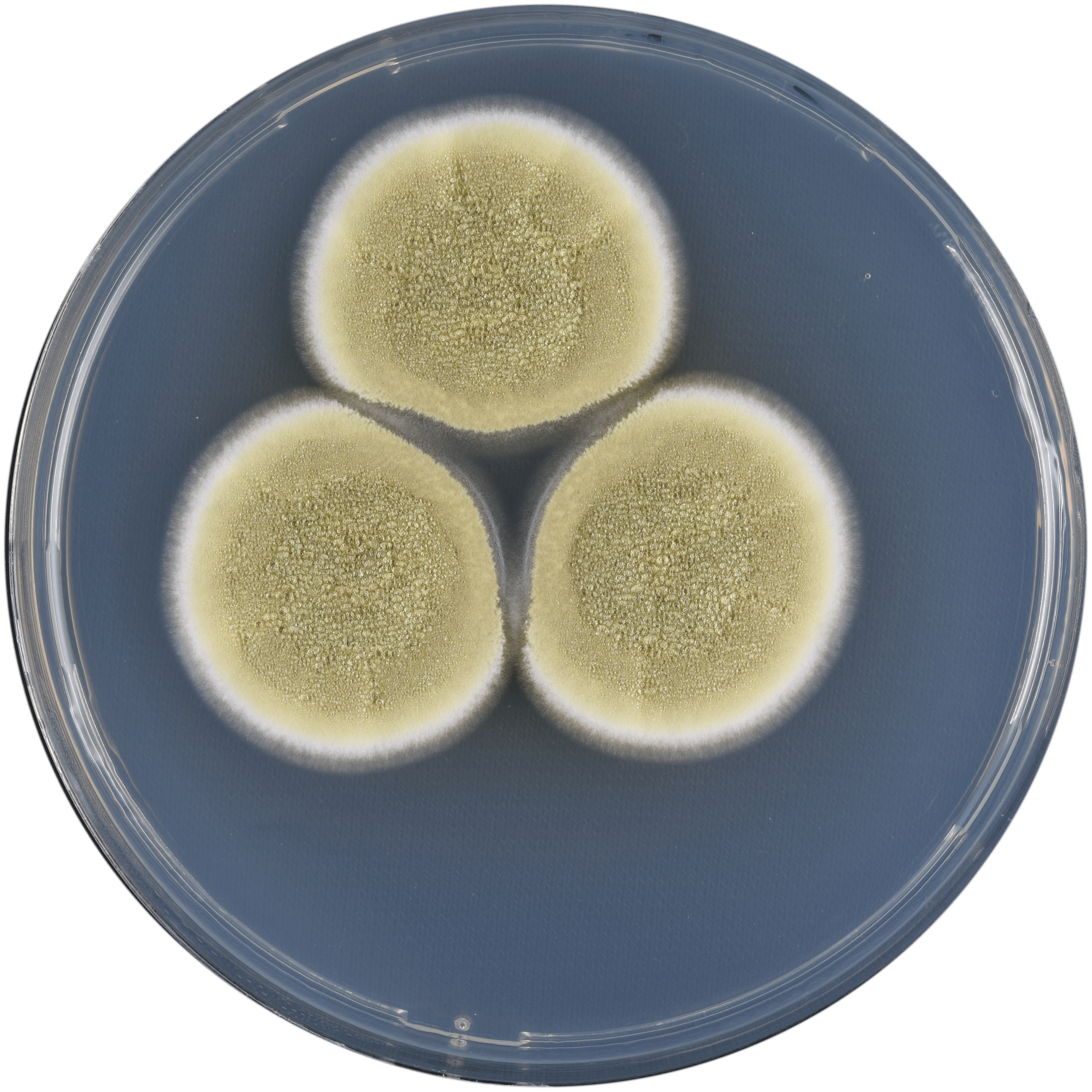
Aspergillus karnatakaensis growing on CYA plate

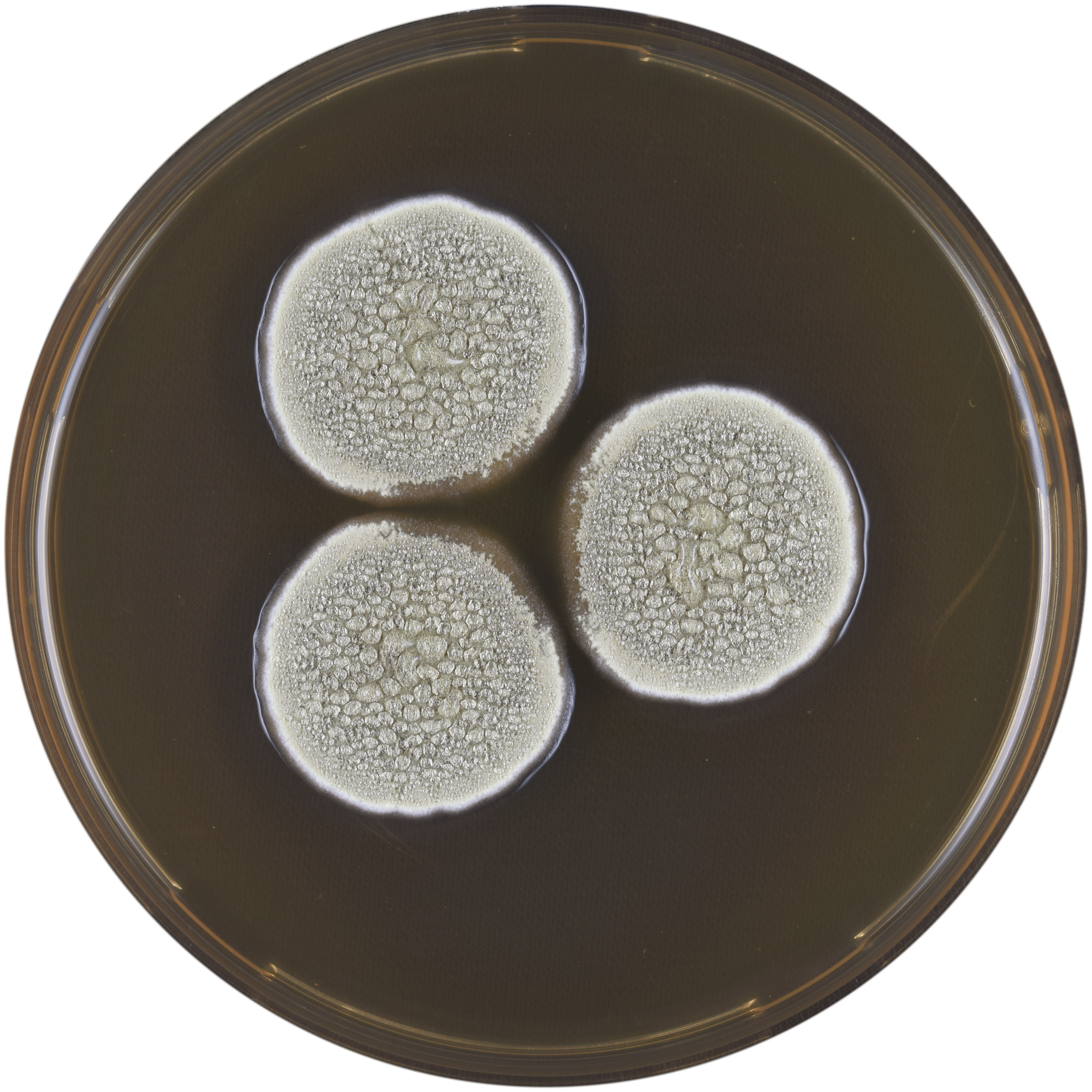
Aspergillus karnatakaensis growing on MEAOX plate
