= Aspergillus botswanensis =

Scientific classification
- Kingdom: Fungi
- Division: Ascomycota
- Class: Eurotiomycetes
- Order: Eurotiales
- Family: Aspergillaceae
- Genus: Aspergillus
- Subgenus: Aspergillus subg. Nidulantes
- Species: A. botswanensis

Binomial name
- Aspergillus botswanensis A.J. Chen, Frisvad & Samson (2016)

Species of fungus

Aspergillus botswanensis is a species of fungus in the genus Aspergillus. It is from the Nidulantes section. The species was first described in 2016. It has been isolated from forest soil at the base of an ebony tree in Botswana.

Aspergillus botswanensis has been cultivated on both Czapek yeast extract agar (CYA) plates and Malt Extract Agar Oxoid® (MEAOX) plates. The growth morphology of the colonies can be seen in the pictures below.

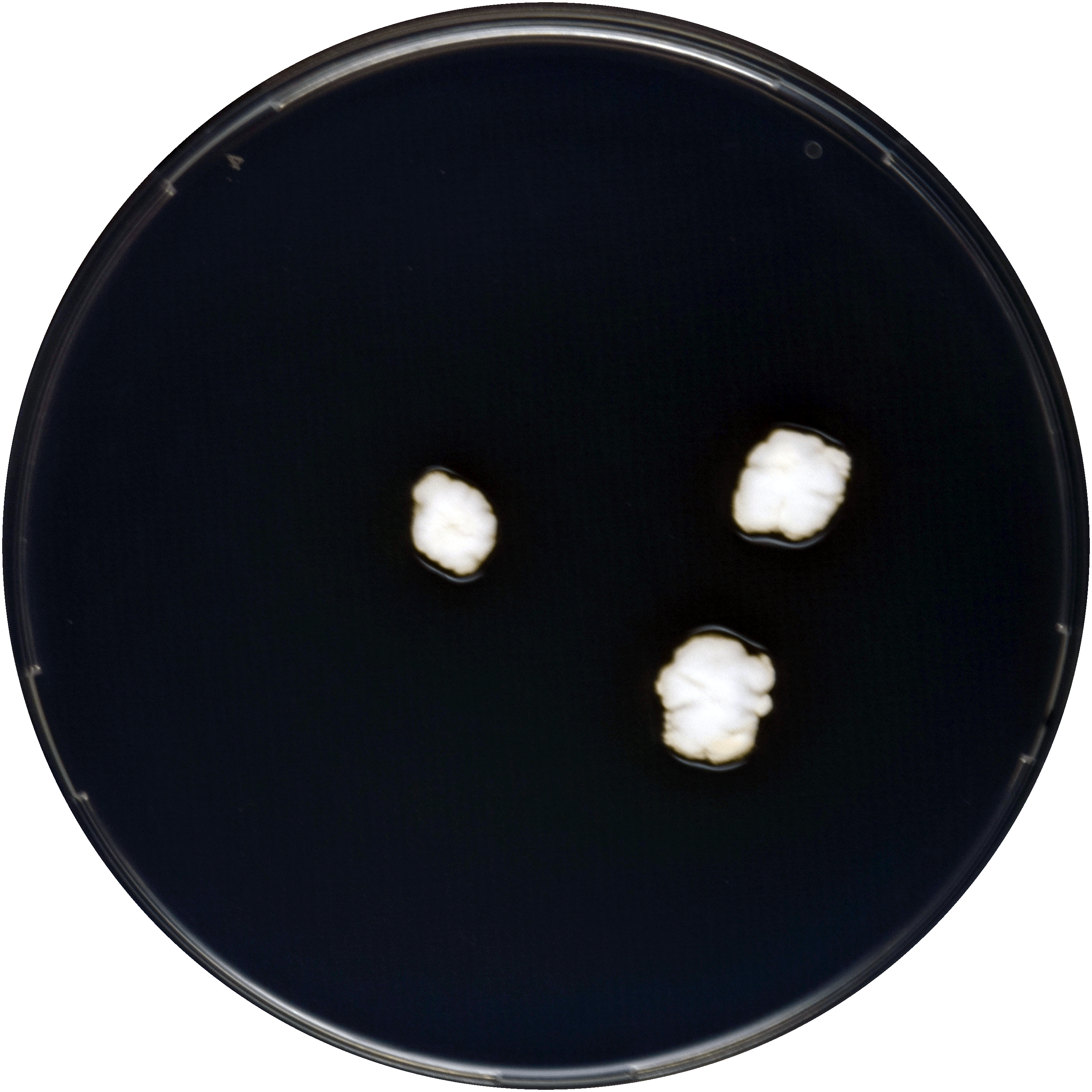
Aspergillus botswanensis growing on CYA plate

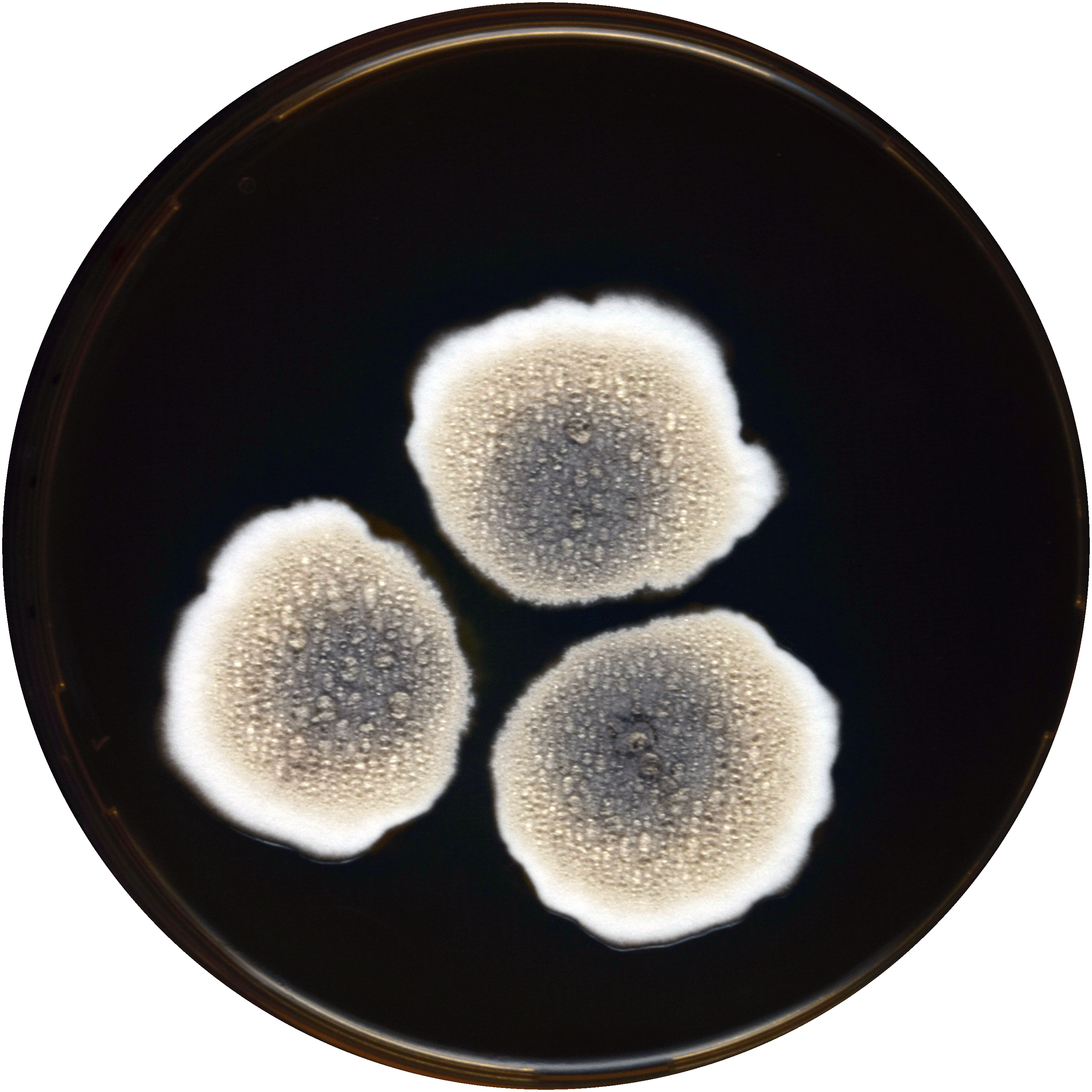
Aspergillus botswanensis growing on MEAOX plate
