= Aspergillus pseudoustus =

Scientific classification
- Kingdom: Fungi
- Division: Ascomycota
- Class: Eurotiomycetes
- Order: Eurotiales
- Family: Aspergillaceae
- Genus: Aspergillus
- Species: A. pseudoustus

Binomial name
- Aspergillus pseudoustus Frisvad, Varga & Samson (2011)

Species of fungus

Aspergillus pseudoustus is a species of fungus in the genus Aspergillus. It is from the Usti section. The species was first described in 2011. It has been reported to produce asperugins, austamide, austocystin, norsolorinic acid, versicolorin C, and averufin.

== Growth and morphology ==
A. pseudoustus has been cultivated on both Czapek yeast extract agar (CYA) plates and Malt Extract Agar Oxoid® (MEAOX) plates. The growth morphology of the colonies can be seen in the pictures below.

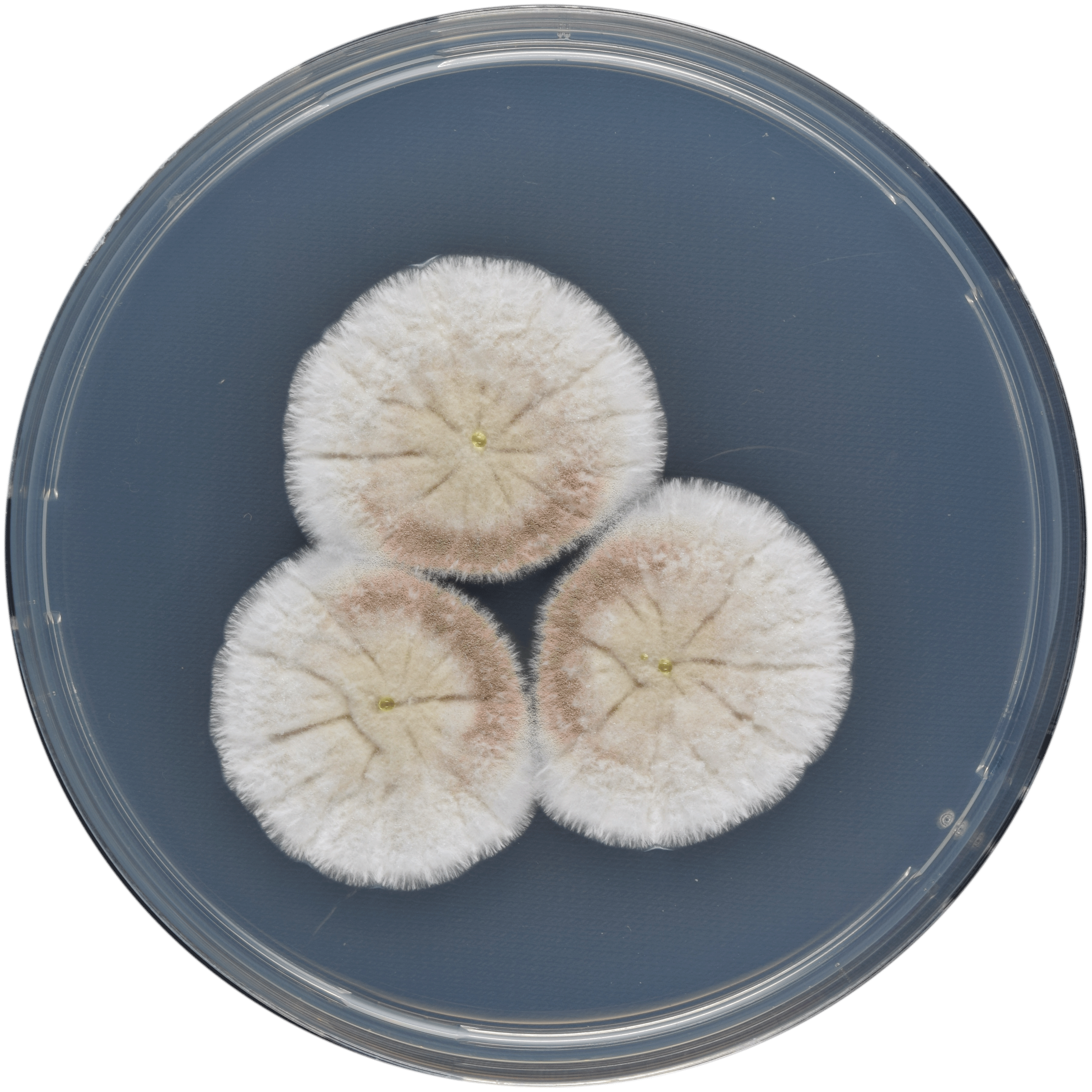
Aspergillus pseudoustus growing on CYA plate

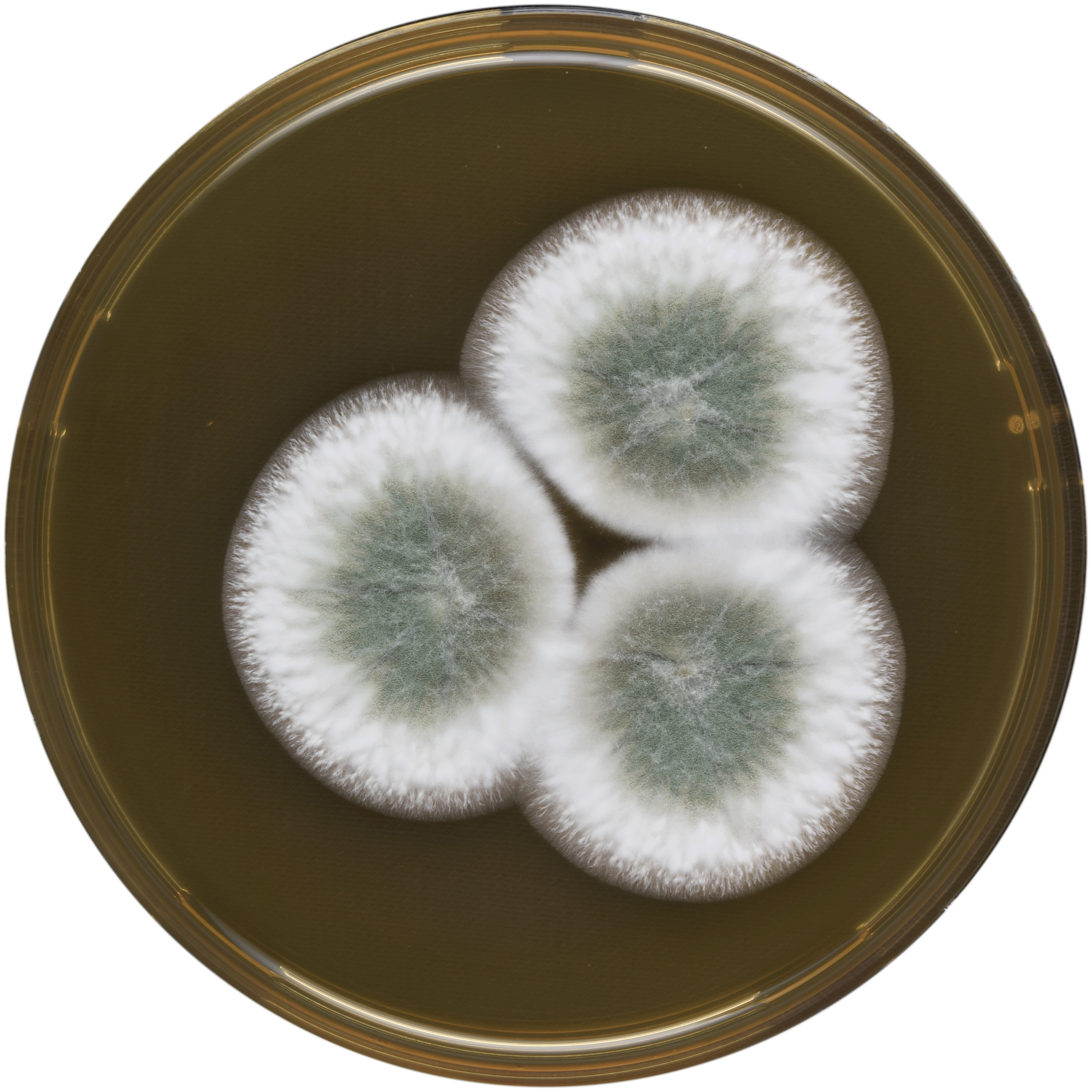
Aspergillus pseudoustus growing on MEAOX plate
