= Aspergillus sulphureoviridis =

Scientific classification
- Kingdom: Fungi
- Division: Ascomycota
- Class: Eurotiomycetes
- Order: Eurotiales
- Family: Aspergillaceae
- Genus: Aspergillus
- Species: A. sulphureoviridis

Binomial name
- Aspergillus sulphureoviridis A.J. Chen, Frisvad & Samson (2016)

Species of fungus

Aspergillus sulphureoviridis is a species of fungus in the genus Aspergillus. It is from the Nidulantes section. The species was first described in 2016. It has been isolated from indoor air in Denmark.

== Growth and morphology ==
A. sulphureoviridis has been cultivated on both Czapek yeast extract agar (CYA) plates and Malt Extract Agar Oxoid® (MEAOX) plates. The growth morphology of the colonies can be seen in the pictures below.

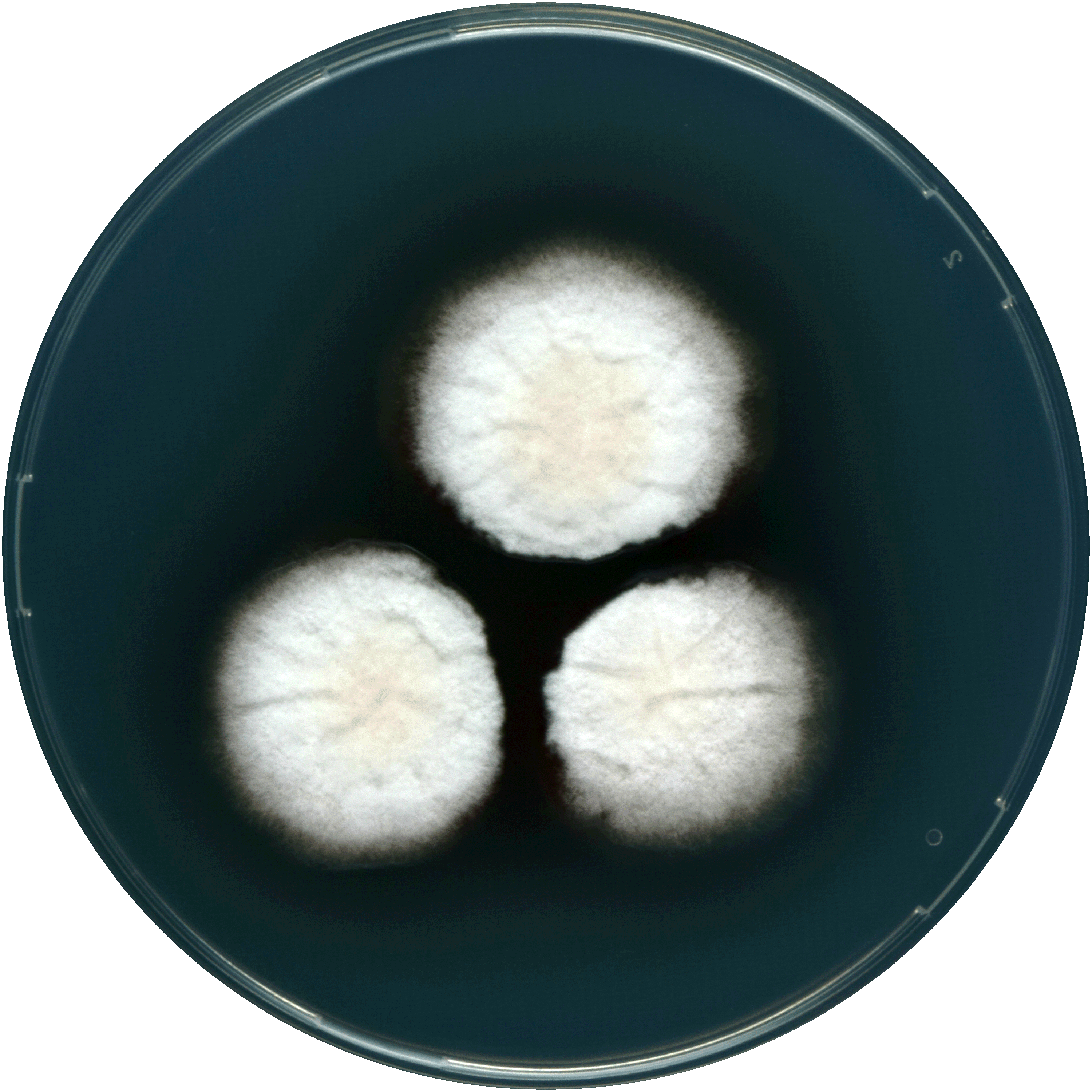
Aspergillus sulphureoviridis growing on CYA plate

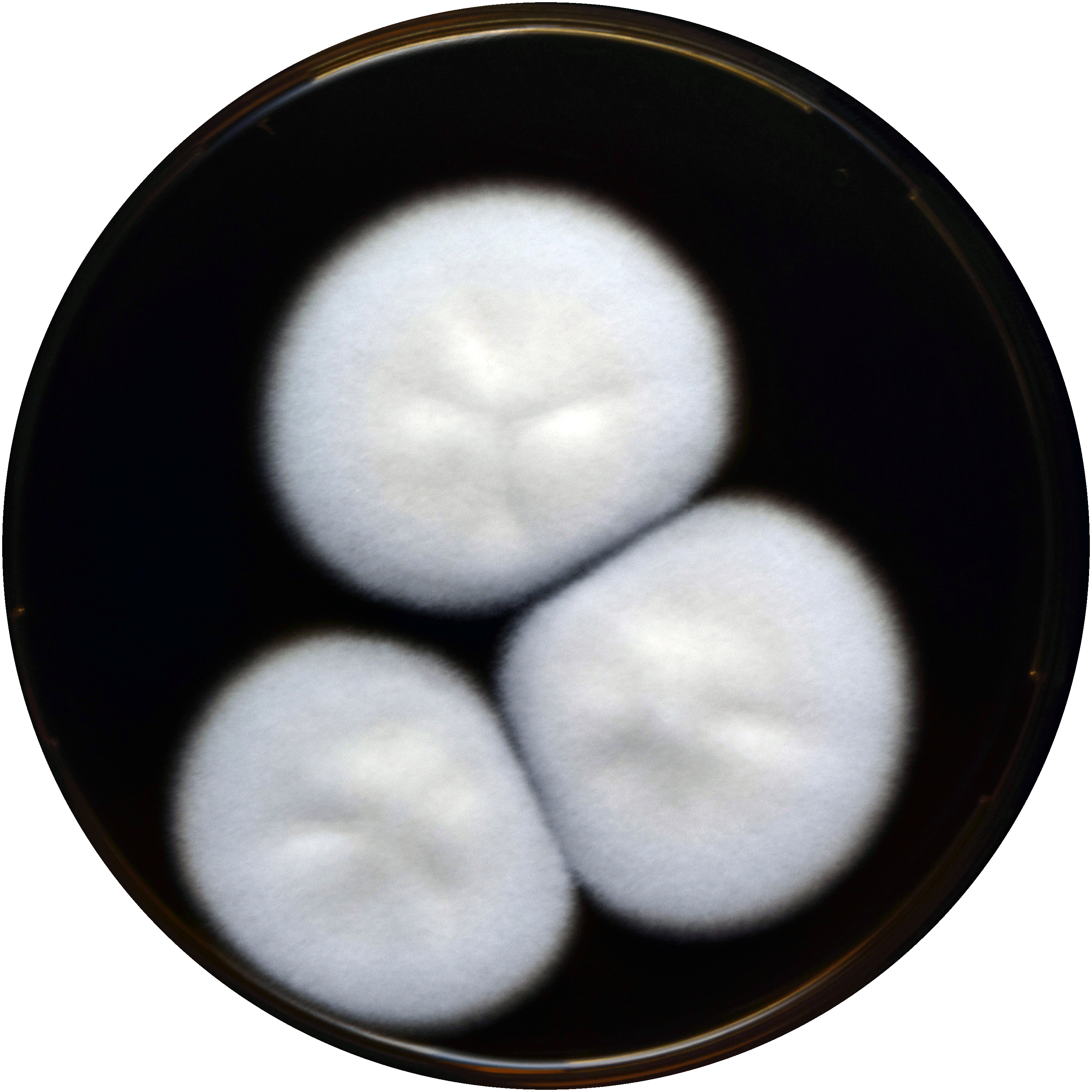
Aspergillus sulphureoviridis growing on MEAOX plate
