= Aspergillus conjunctus =

Scientific classification
- Kingdom: Fungi
- Division: Ascomycota
- Class: Eurotiomycetes
- Order: Eurotiales
- Family: Aspergillaceae
- Genus: Aspergillus
- Species: A. conjunctus

Binomial name
- Aspergillus conjunctus Kwon-Chung & Fennell (1965)

Species of fungus

Aspergillus conjunctus is a species of fungus in the genus Aspergillus. It is from the Sparsi section. The species was first described in 1965. It has been isolated from forest soil in Costa Rica. It has been reported to produce auroglaucin.

== Growth and morphology ==
A. conjunctus has been cultivated on both Czapek yeast extract agar (CYA) plates and Malt Extract Agar Oxoid® (MEAOX) plates. The growth morphology of the colonies can be seen in the pictures below.

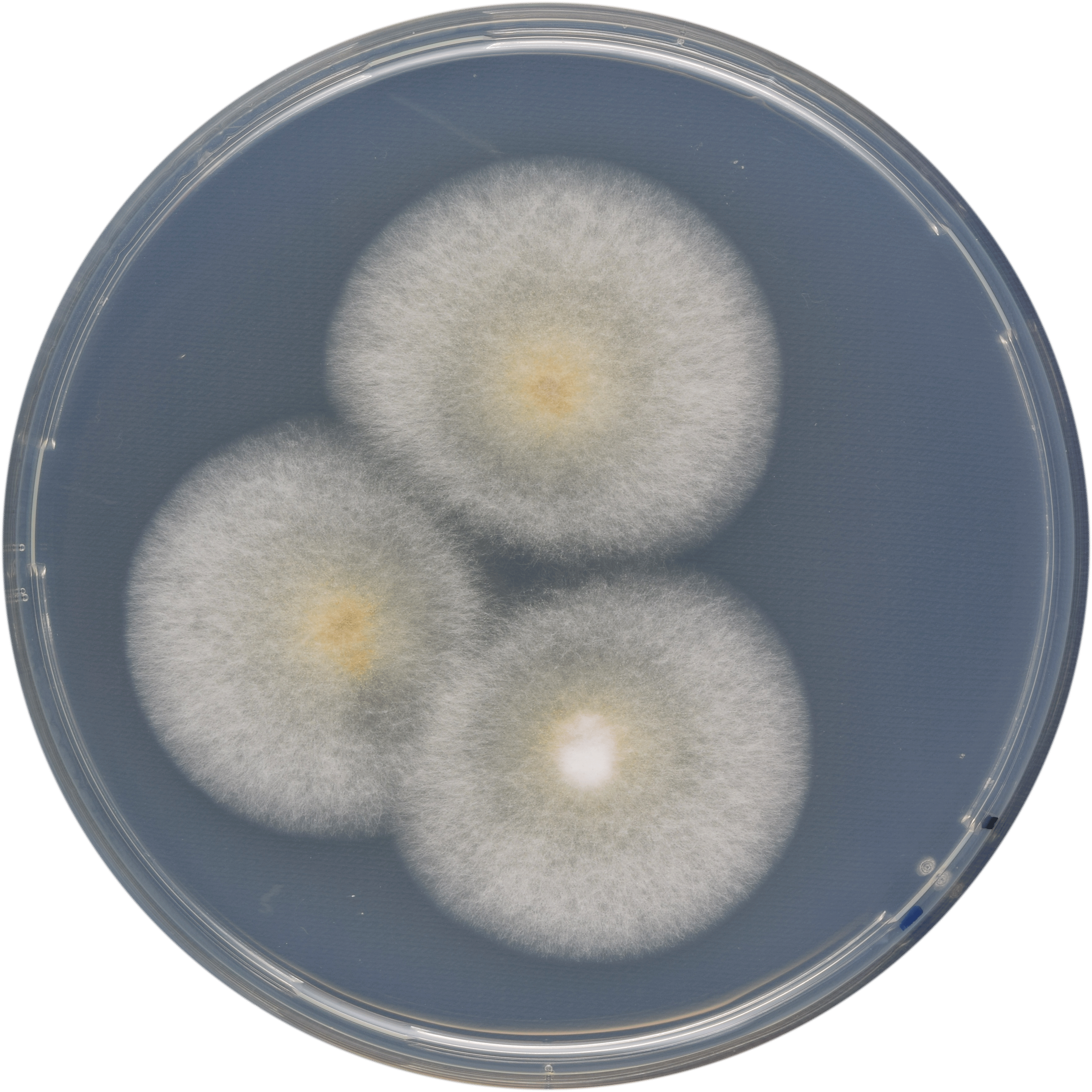
Aspergillus conjunctus growing on CYA plate

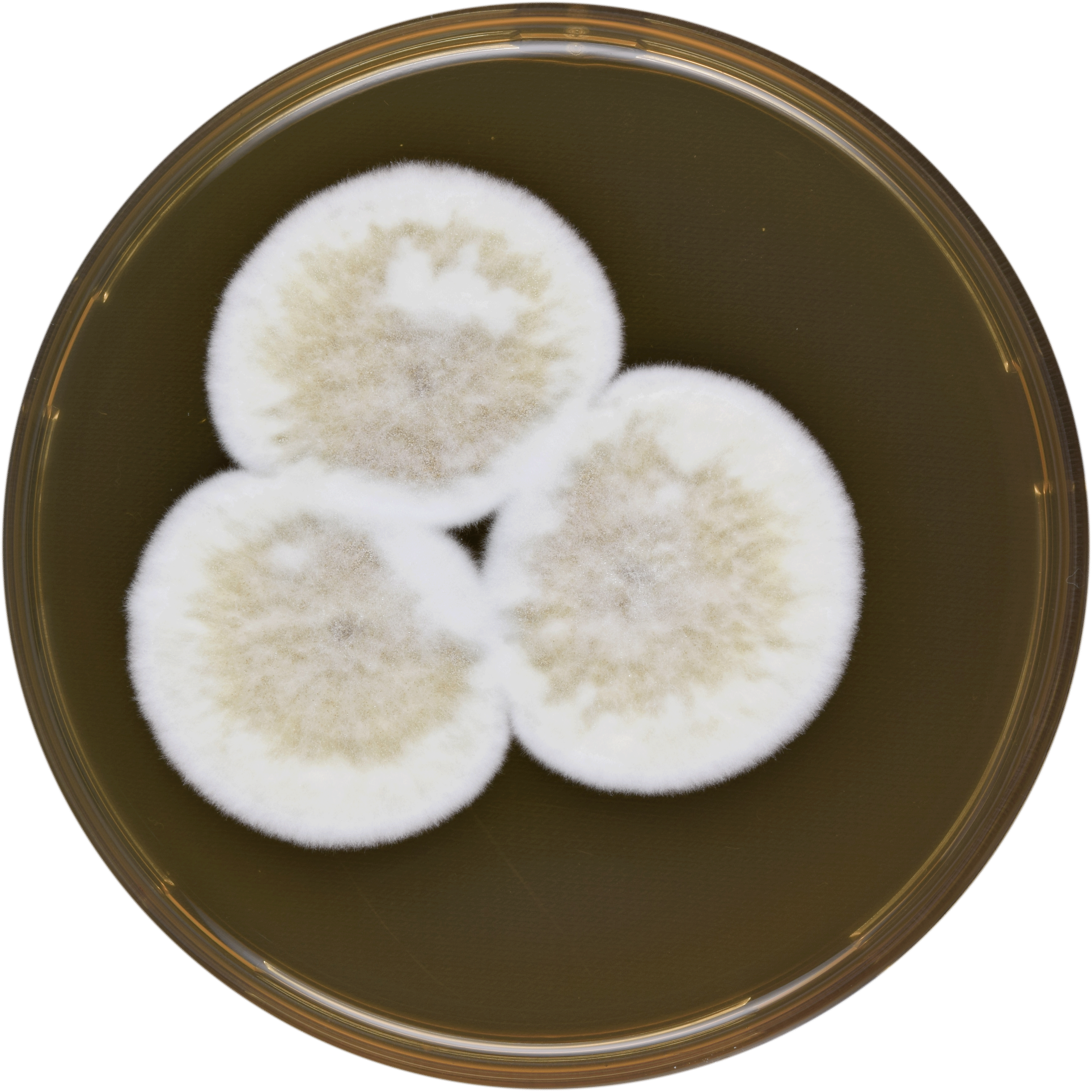
Aspergillus conjunctus growing on MEAOX plate
