= Aspergillus heyangensis =

Scientific classification
- Kingdom: Fungi
- Division: Ascomycota
- Class: Eurotiomycetes
- Order: Eurotiales
- Family: Aspergillaceae
- Genus: Aspergillus
- Species: A. heyangensis

Binomial name
- Aspergillus heyangensis Z.T. Qi, Z.M. Sun & Yu X. Wang (1994)

Species of fungus

Aspergillus heyangensis is a species of fungus in the genus Aspergillus. It is from the Aenei section. The species was first described in 1994. It has been reported to produce a decaturin.

== Growth and morphology ==
A. heyangensis has been cultivated on both Czapek yeast extract agar (CYA) plates and Malt Extract Agar Oxoid® (MEAOX) plates. The growth morphology of the colonies can be seen in the pictures below.

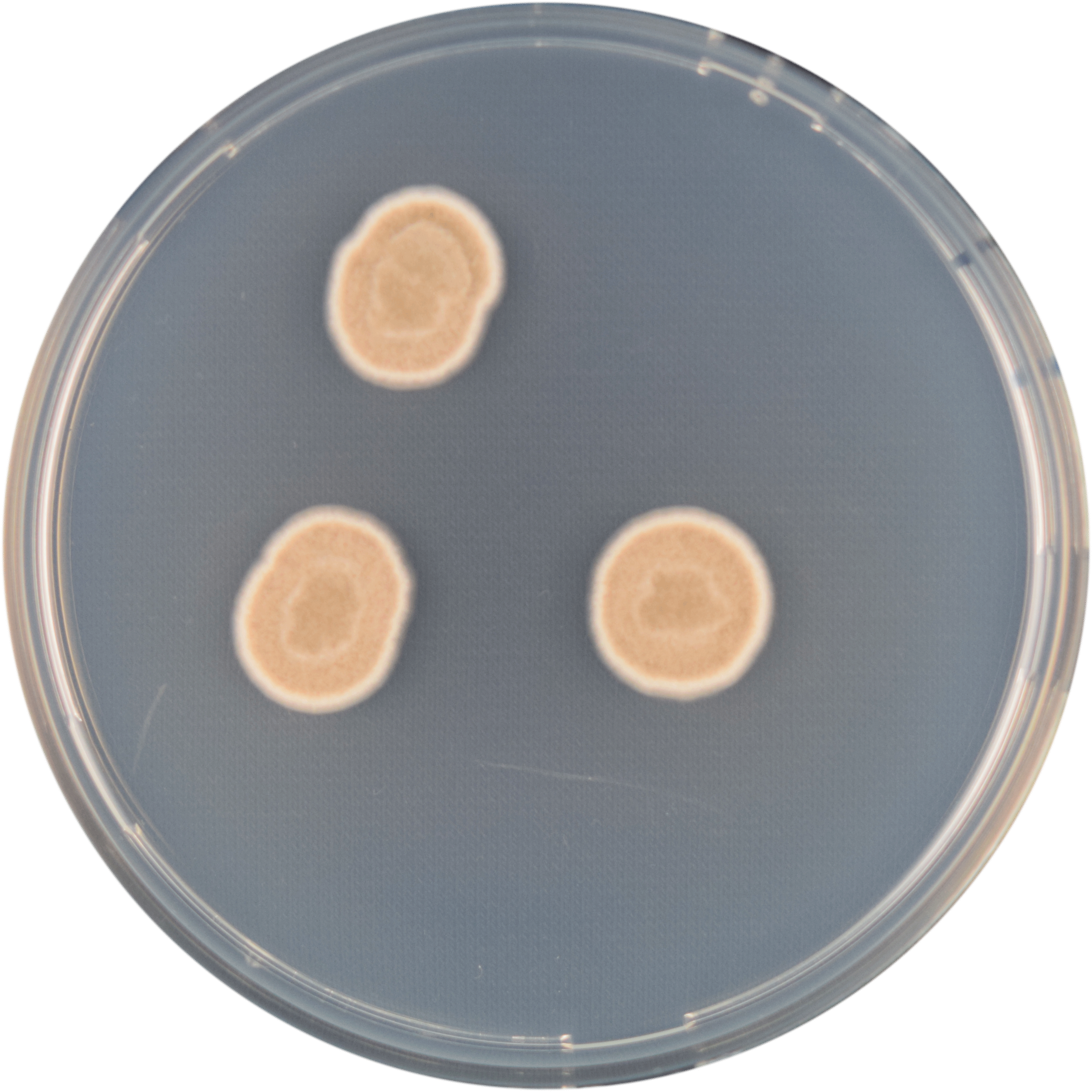
Aspergillus heyangensis growing on CYA plate

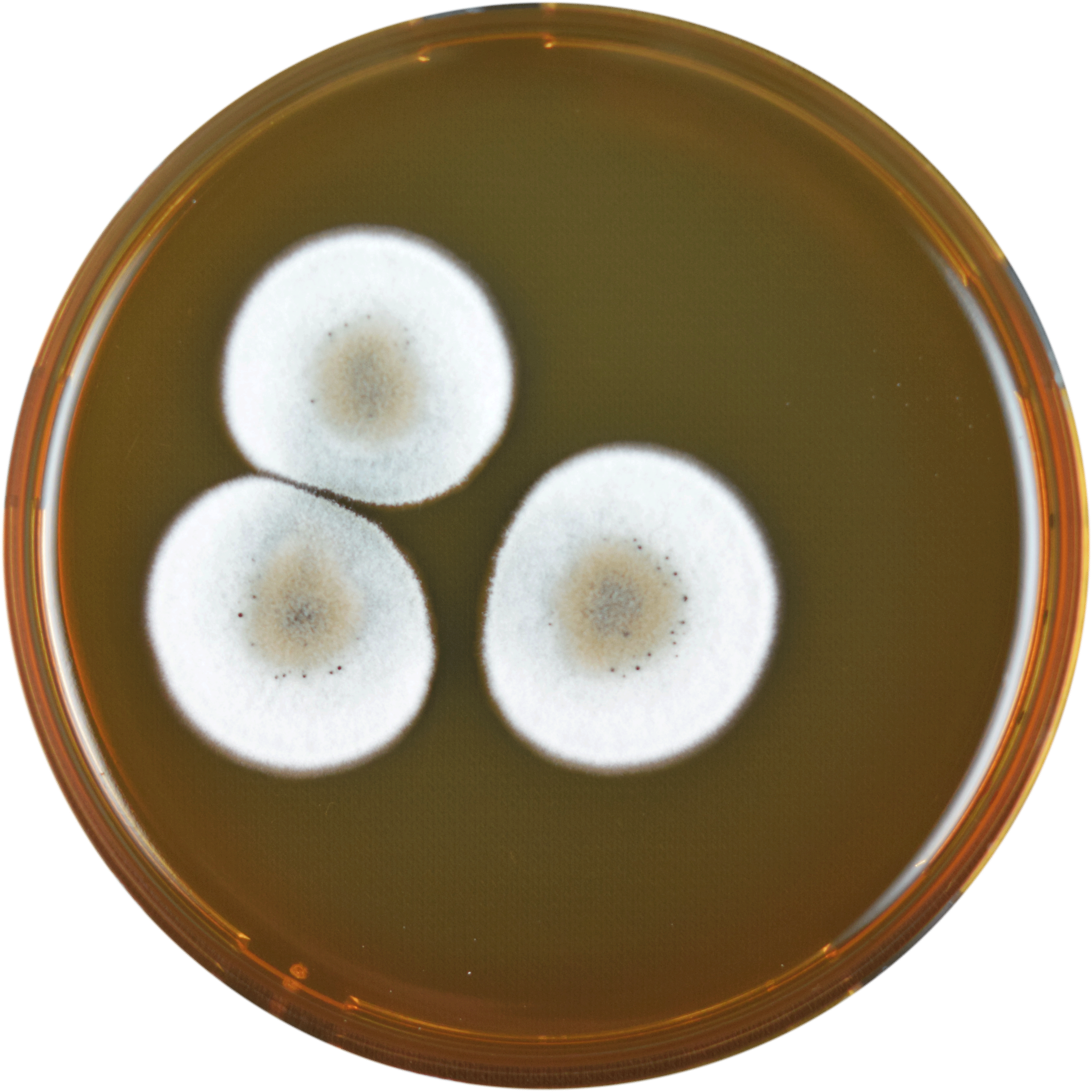
Aspergillus heyangensis growing on MEAOX plate
