= Aspergillus egyptiacus =

Scientific classification
- Kingdom: Fungi
- Division: Ascomycota
- Class: Eurotiomycetes
- Order: Eurotiales
- Family: Aspergillaceae
- Genus: Aspergillus
- Species: A. egyptiacus

Binomial name
- Aspergillus egyptiacus Moubasher & Moustafa (1972)

Species of fungus

Aspergillus egyptiacus is a species of fungus in the genus Aspergillus. It is from the Cavernicolus section. The species was first described in 1972. It was isolated from sandy soil in Egypt.

== Growth and morphology ==
A. egyptiacus has been cultivated on both Czapek yeast extract agar (CYA) plates and Malt Extract Agar Oxoid® (MEAOX) plates. The growth morphology of the colonies can be seen in the pictures below.

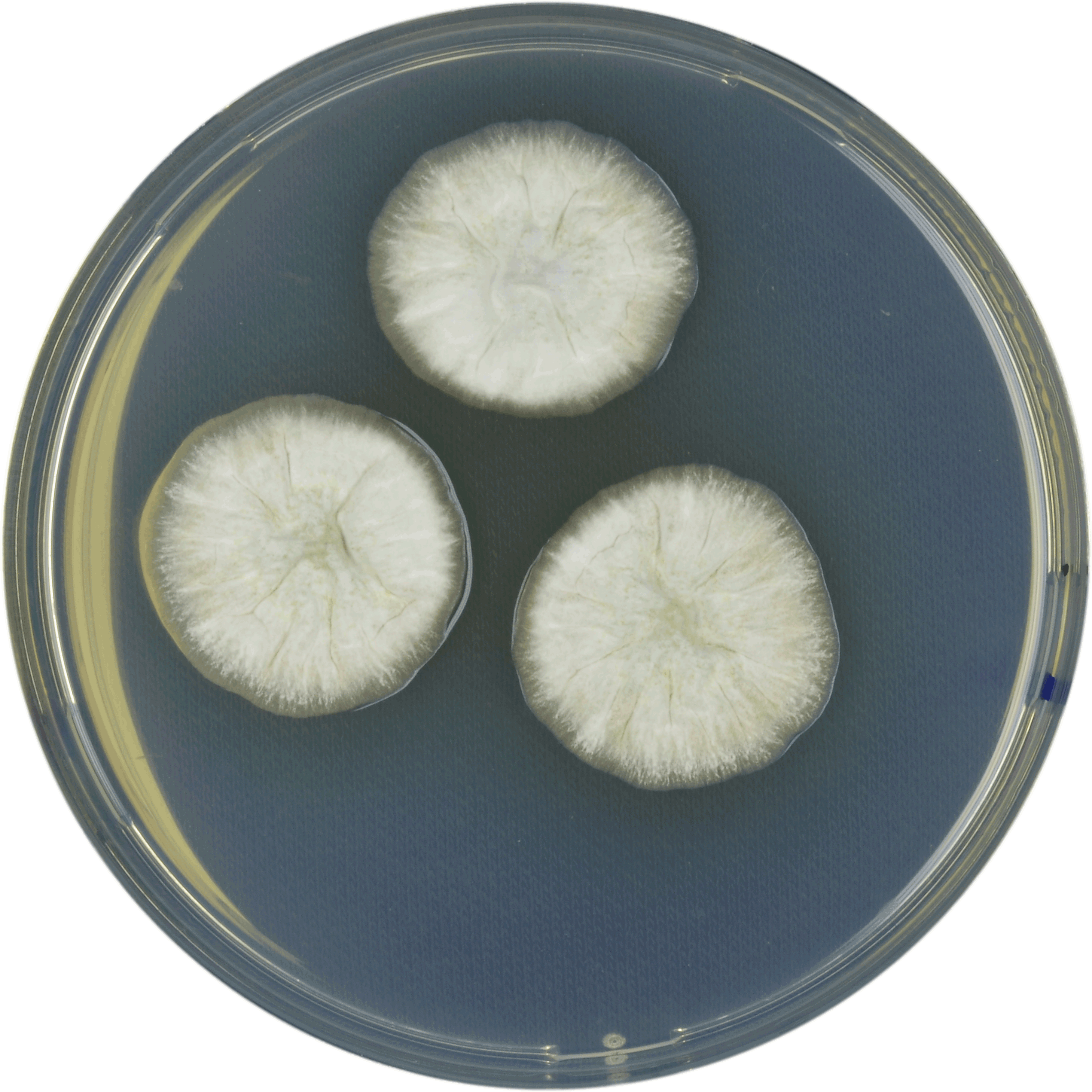
Aspergillus egyptiacus growing on CYA plate

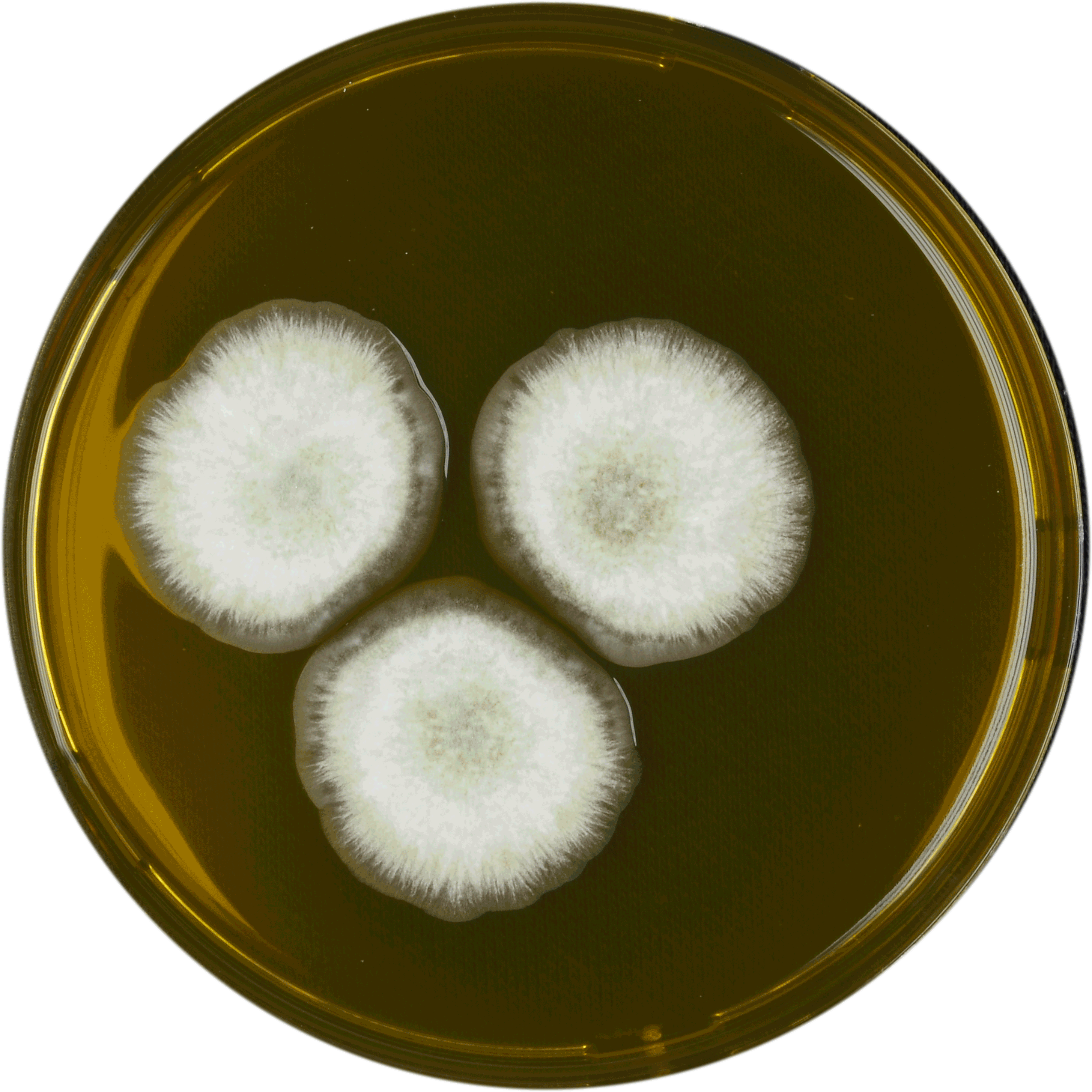
Aspergillus egyptiacus growing on MEAOX plate
