= Aspergillus tabacinus =

Scientific classification
- Kingdom: Fungi
- Division: Ascomycota
- Class: Eurotiomycetes
- Order: Eurotiales
- Family: Aspergillaceae
- Genus: Aspergillus
- Species: A. tabacinus

Binomial name
- Aspergillus tabacinus Nakazawa, Y. Takeda, Simo & A. Watanabe (1934)

Species of fungus

Aspergillus tabacinus is a species of fungus in the genus Aspergillus. It is from the Versicolores section. The species was first described in 1934.

== Growth and morphology ==
A. tabacinus has been cultivated on both Czapek yeast extract agar (CYA) plates and Malt Extract Agar Oxoid® (MEAOX) plates. The growth morphology of the colonies can be seen in the pictures below.

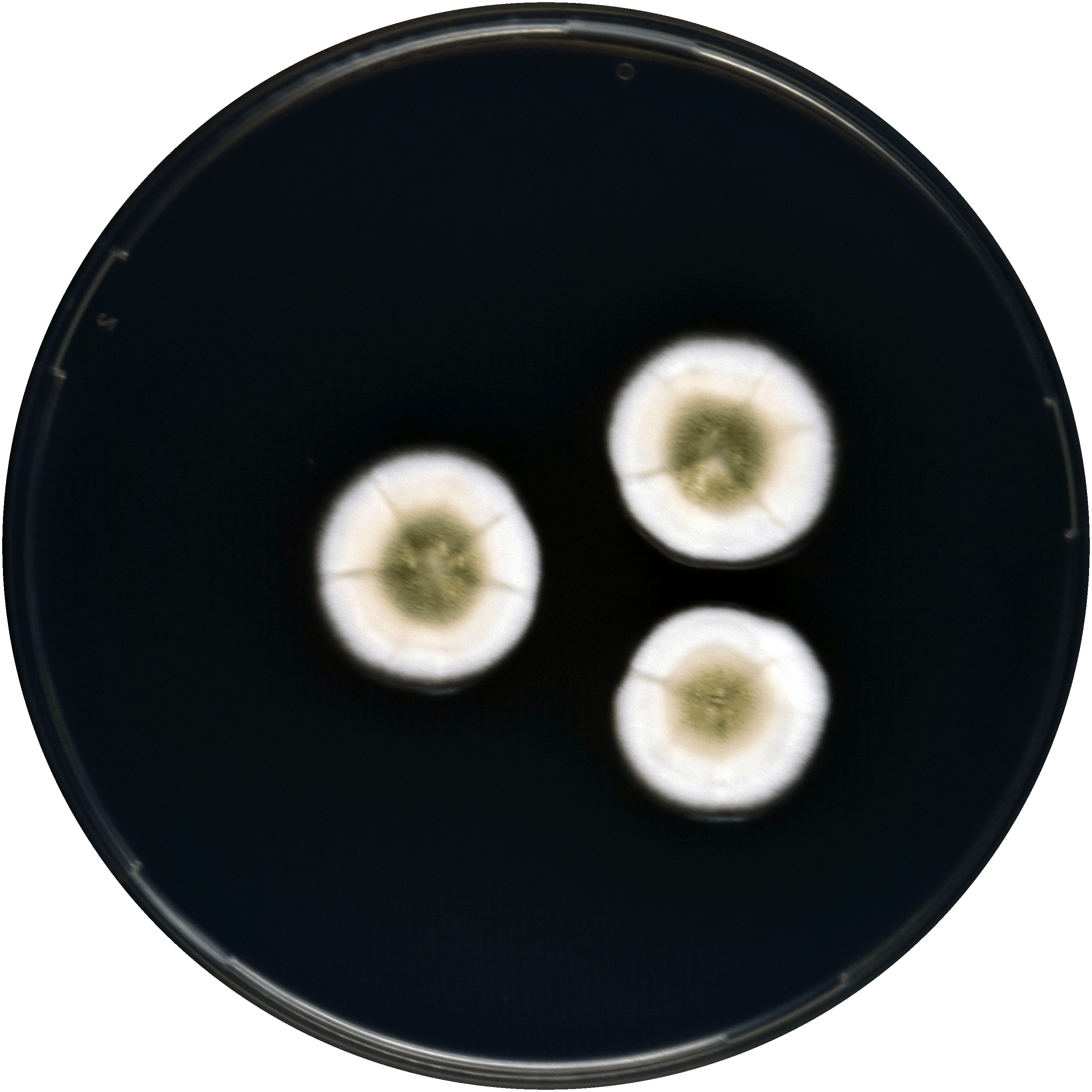
Aspergillus tabacinus growing on CYA plate

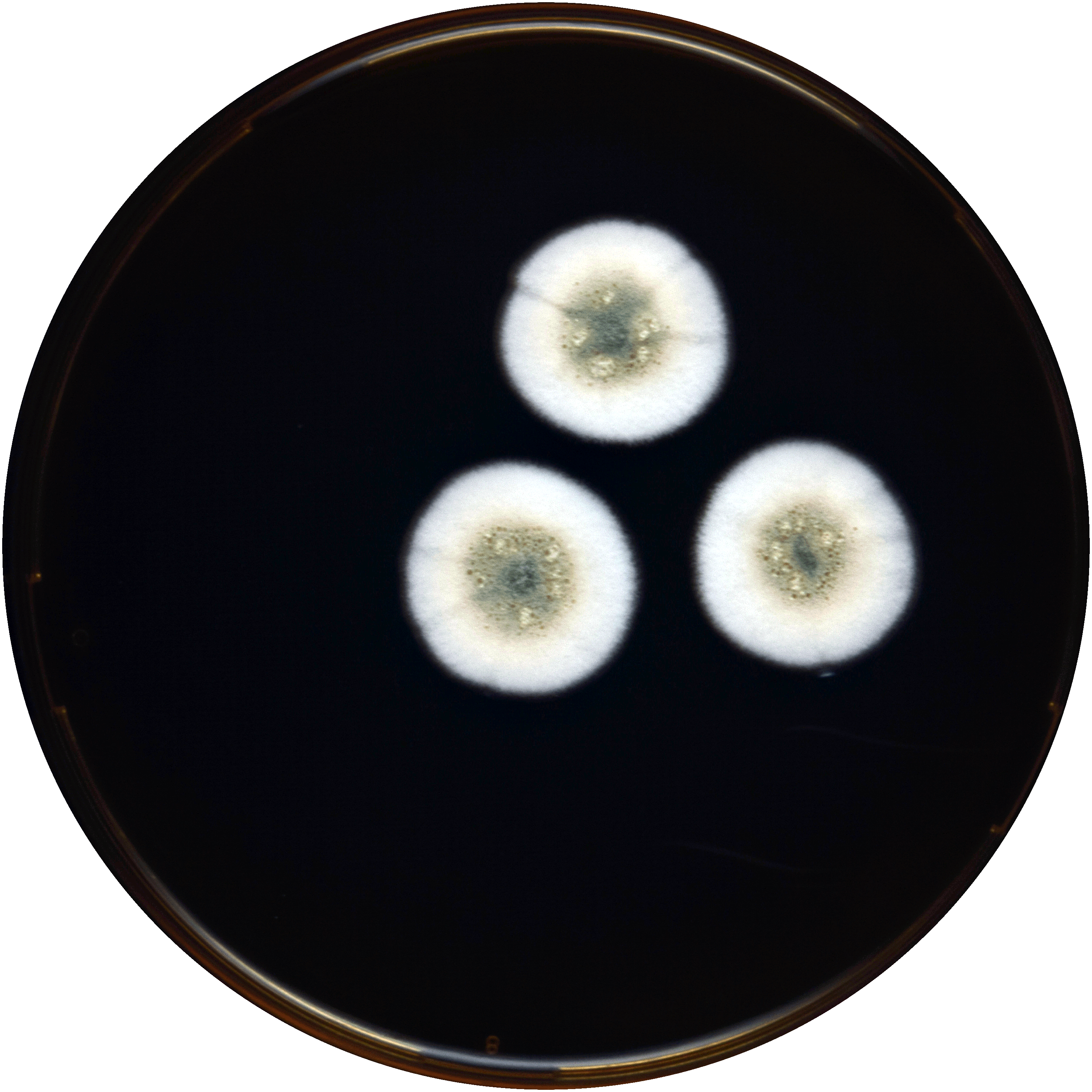
Aspergillus tabacinus growing on MEAOX plate
