= Aspergillus subversicolor =

Scientific classification
- Kingdom: Fungi
- Division: Ascomycota
- Class: Eurotiomycetes
- Order: Eurotiales
- Family: Aspergillaceae
- Genus: Aspergillus
- Species: A. subversicolor

Binomial name
- Aspergillus subversicolor Jurjević, S.W. Peterson & B.W. Horn (2012)

Species of fungus

Aspergillus subversicolor is a species of fungus in the genus Aspergillus. It is from the Versicolores section. The species was first described in 2012.

== Growth and morphology ==
A. subversicolor has been cultivated on both Czapek yeast extract agar (CYA) plates and Malt Extract Agar Oxoid® (MEAOX) plates. The growth morphology of the colonies can be seen in the pictures below.

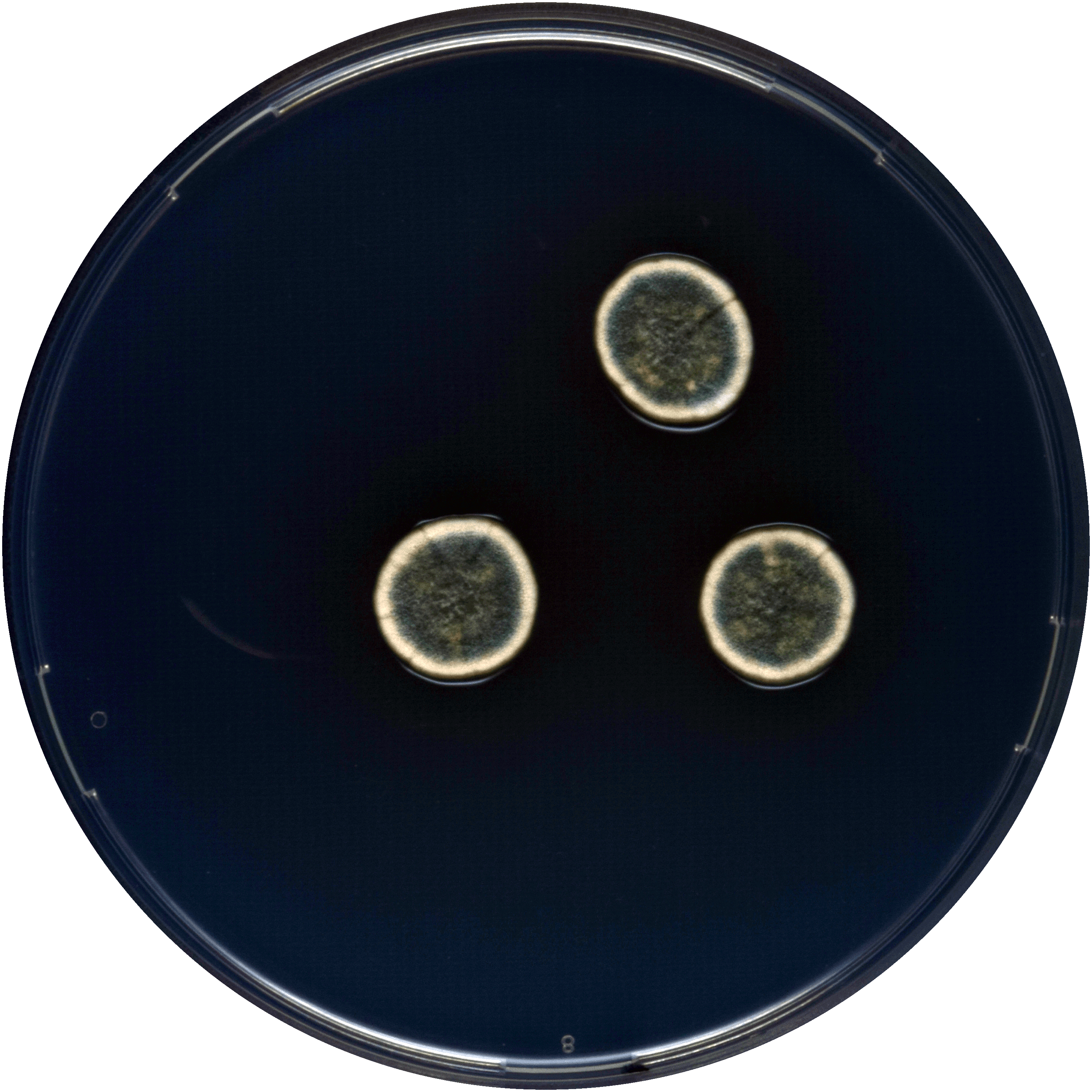
Aspergillus subversicolor growing on CYA plate

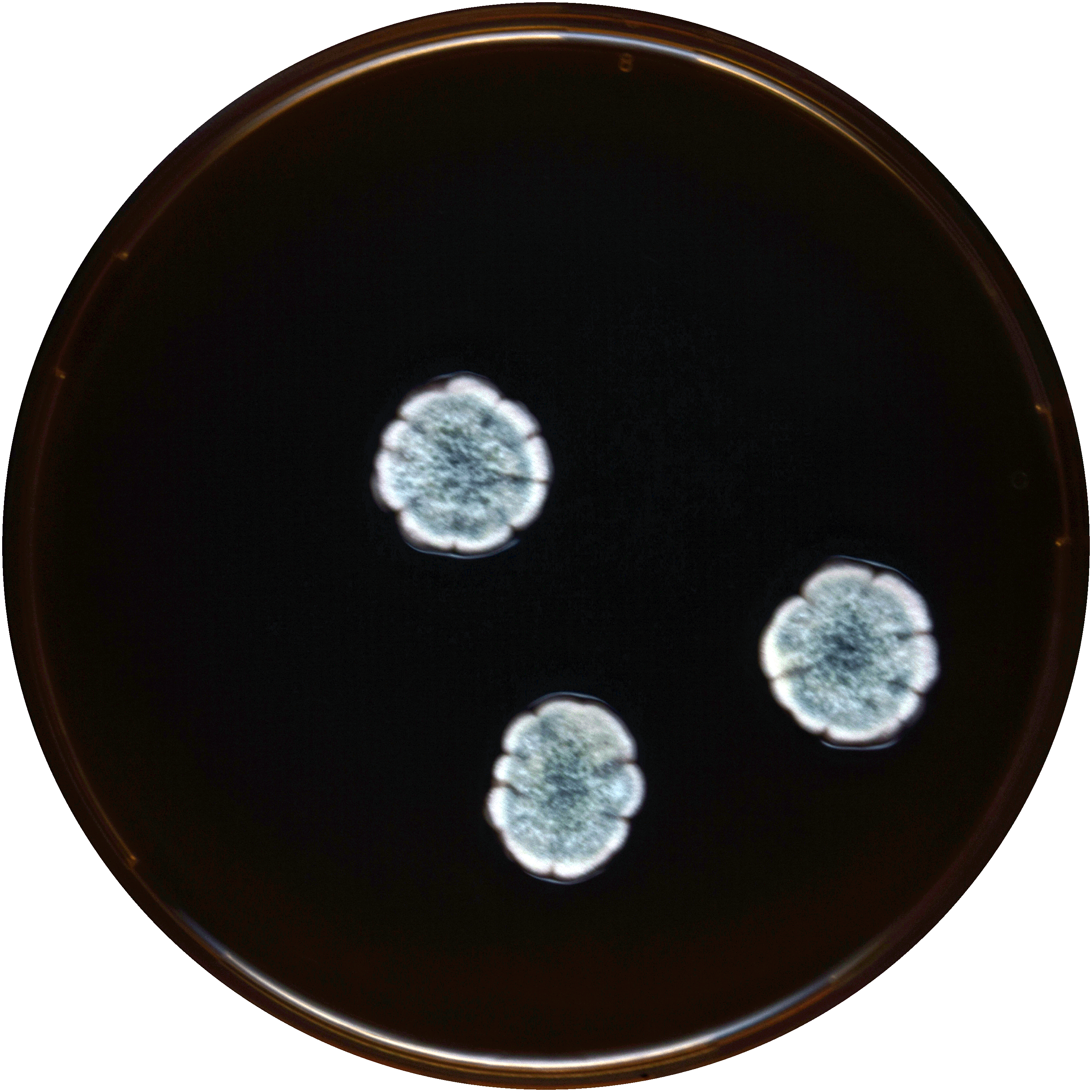
Aspergillus subversicolor growing on MEAOX plate
