= Aspergillus implicatus =

Scientific classification
- Kingdom: Fungi
- Division: Ascomycota
- Class: Eurotiomycetes
- Order: Eurotiales
- Family: Aspergillaceae
- Genus: Aspergillus
- Species: A. implicatus

Binomial name
- Aspergillus implicatus Persiani & Maggi (1994)

Species of fungus

Aspergillus implicatus is a species of fungus in the genus Aspergillus. It is from the Sparsi section. The species was first described in 1994. It has been reported to produce a versicolorin derivative.

== Growth and morphology ==
A. implicatus has been cultivated on both Czapek yeast extract agar (CYA) plates and Malt Extract Agar Oxoid® (MEAOX) plates. The growth morphology of the colonies can be seen in the pictures below.

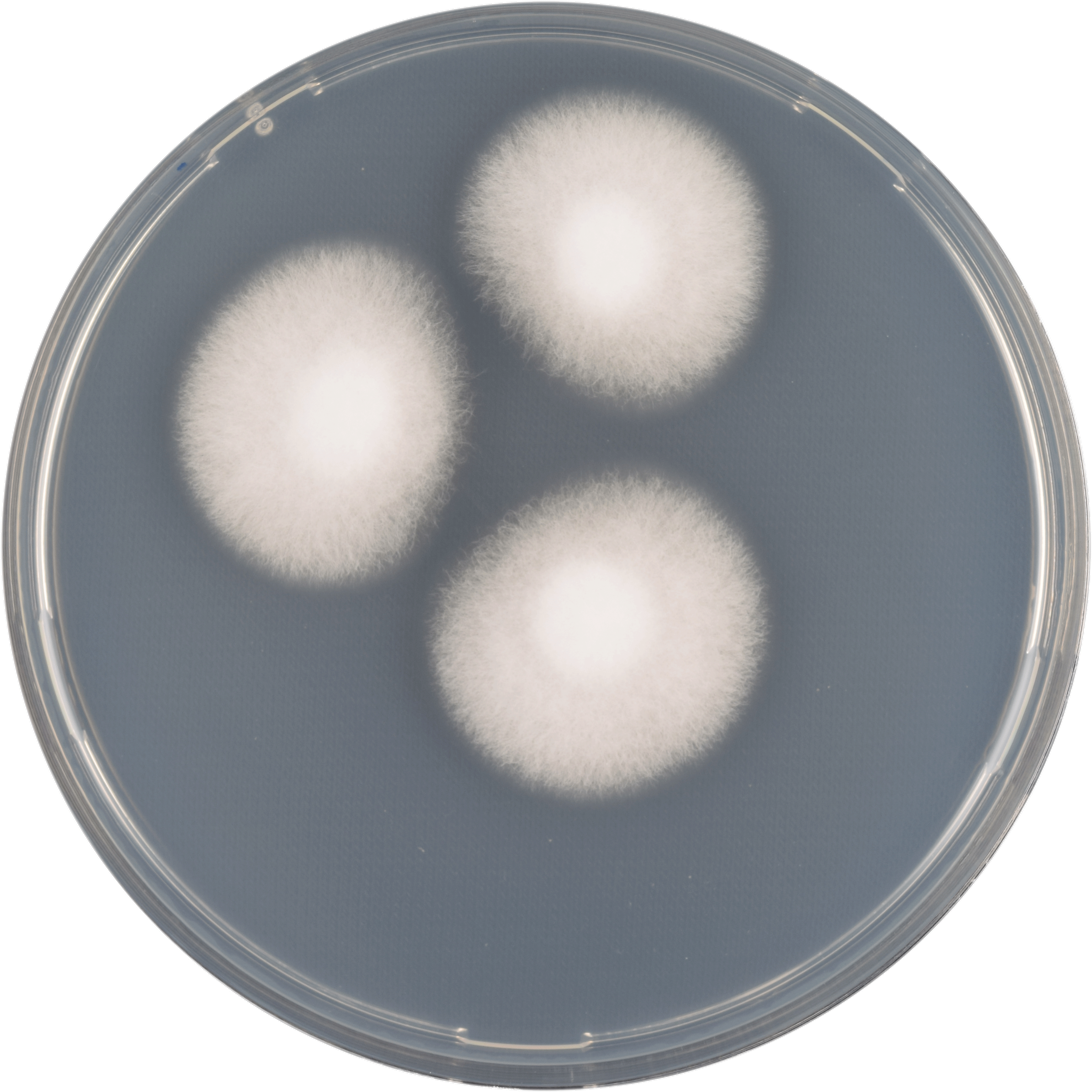
Aspergillus implicatus growing on CYA plate

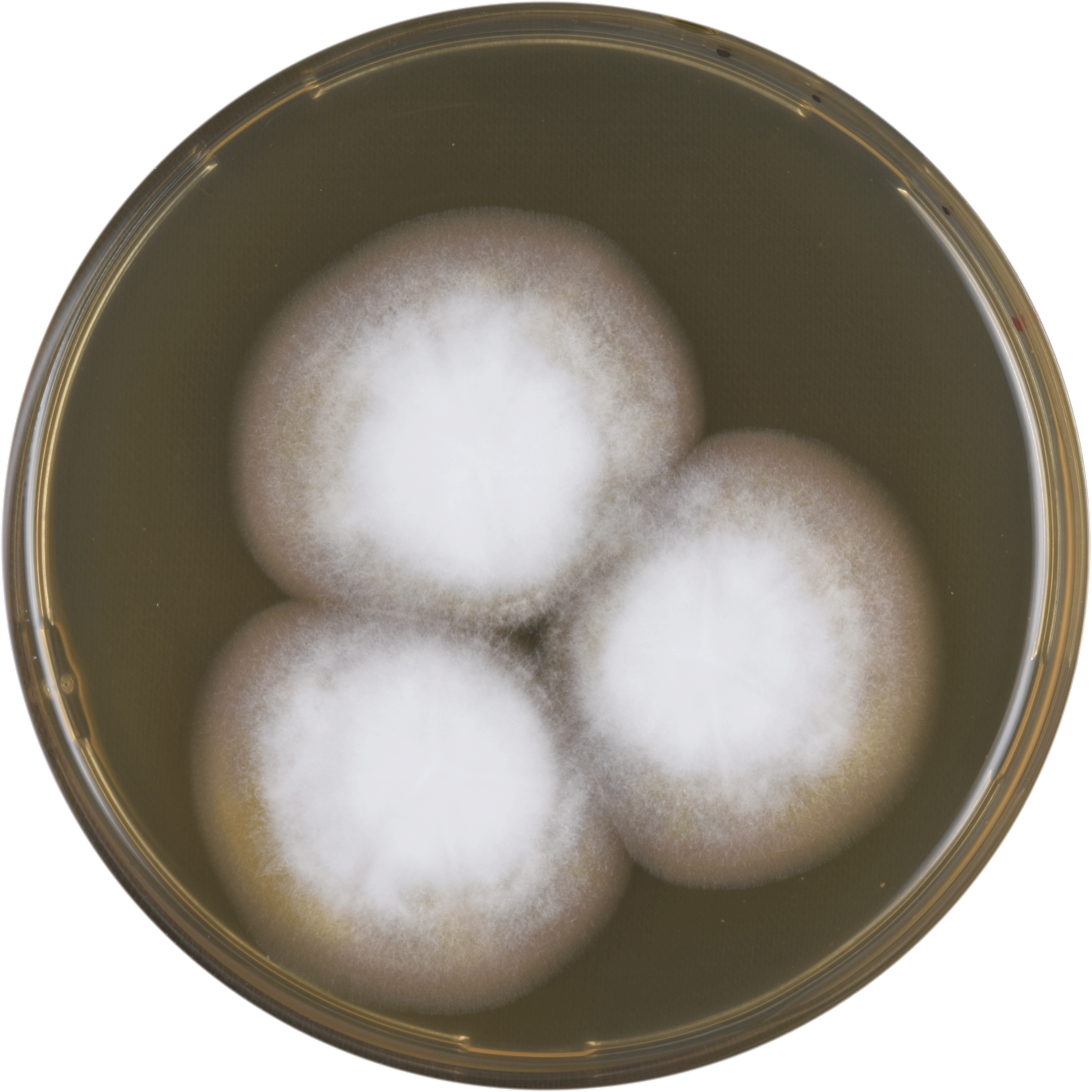
Aspergillus implicatus growing on MEAOX plate
