= Aspergillus jensenii =

Scientific classification
- Kingdom: Fungi
- Division: Ascomycota
- Class: Eurotiomycetes
- Order: Eurotiales
- Family: Aspergillaceae
- Genus: Aspergillus
- Species: A. jensenii

Binomial name
- Aspergillus jensenii Jurjević, S.W. Peterson & B.W. Horn (2012)

Species of fungus

Aspergillus jensenii is a species of fungus in the genus Aspergillus. It is from the Versicolores section. The species was first described in 2012.

== Growth and morphology ==
A. jensenii has been cultivated on both Czapek yeast extract agar (CYA) plates and Malt Extract Agar Oxoid® (MEAOX) plates. The growth morphology of the colonies can be seen in the pictures below.

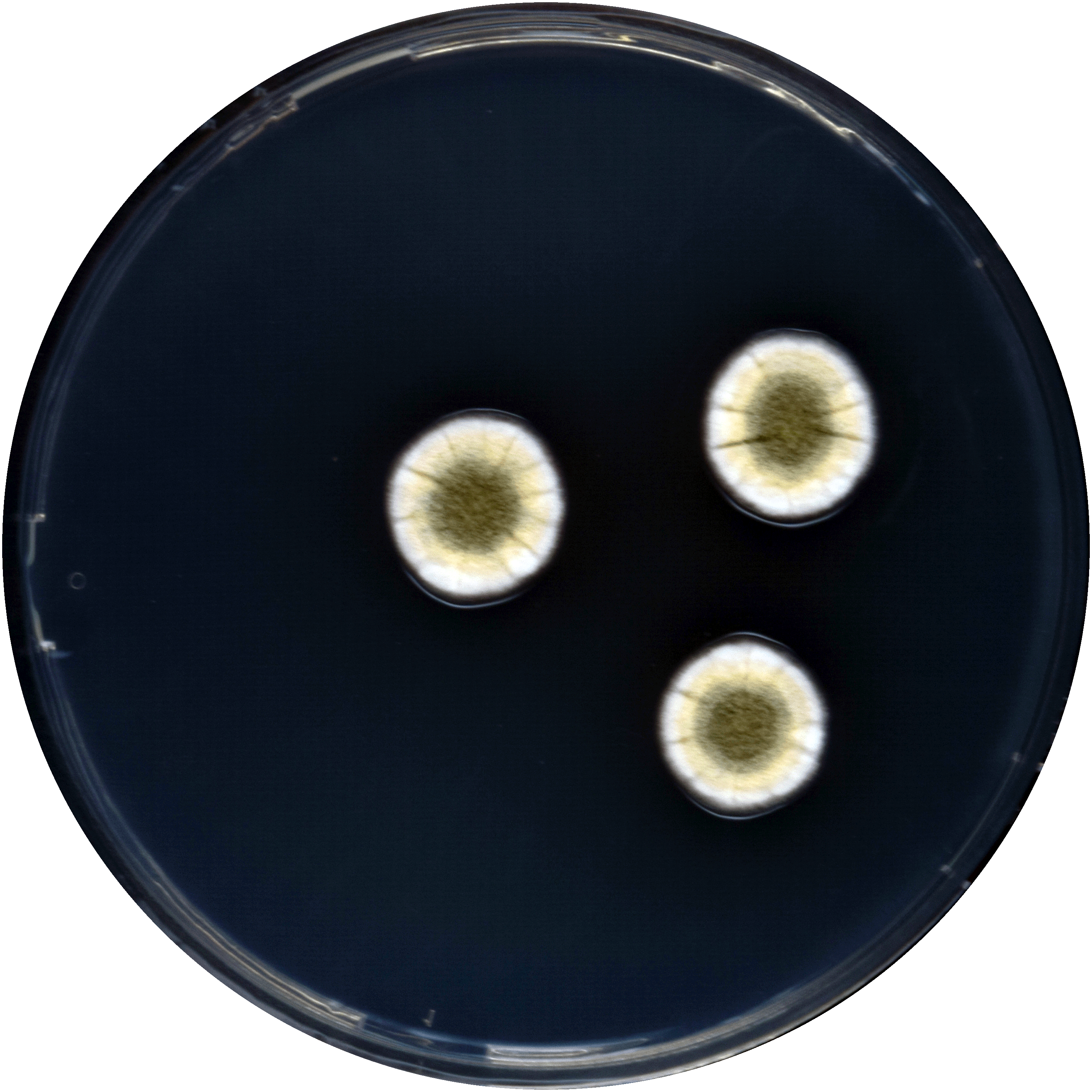
Aspergillus jensenii growing on CYA plate

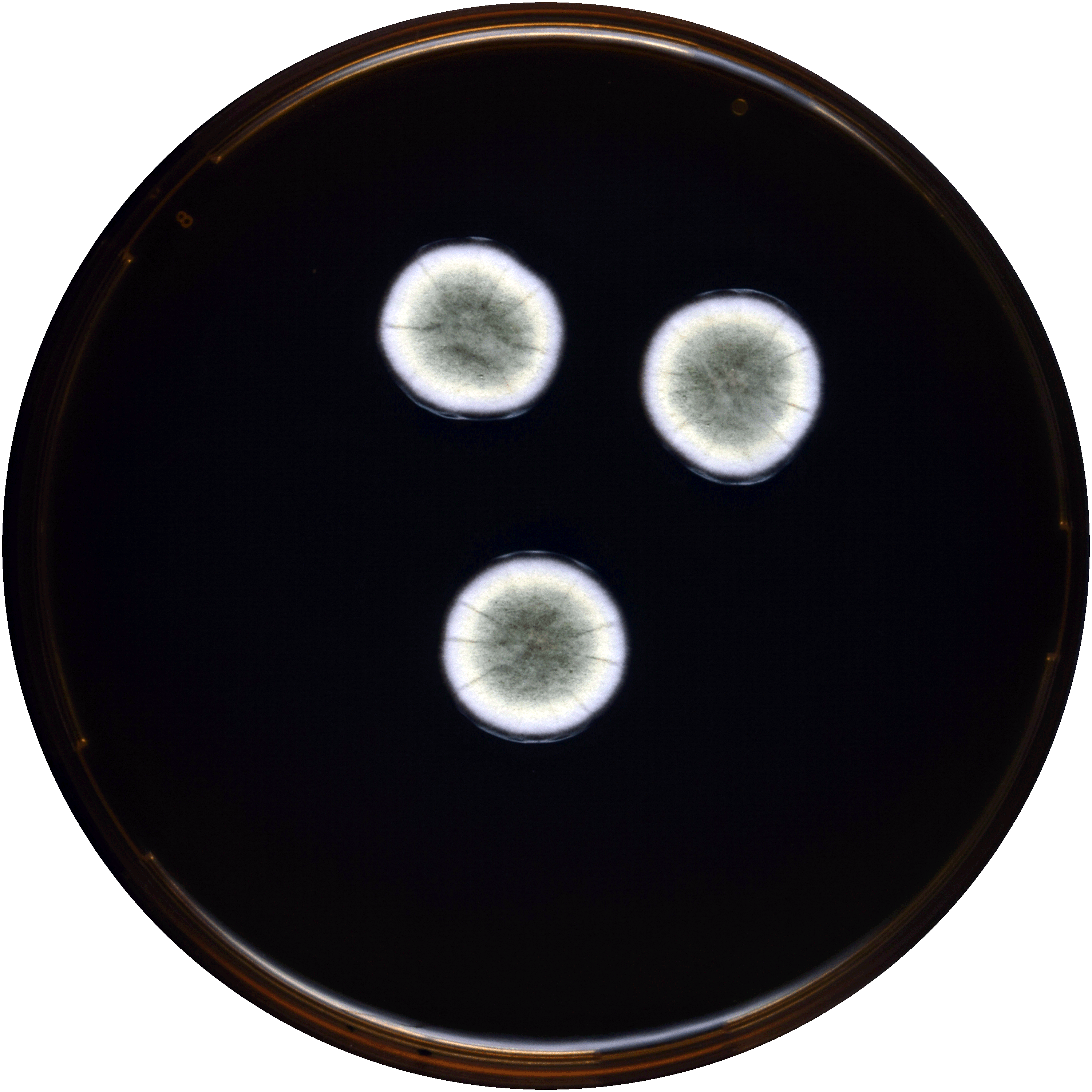
Aspergillus jensenii growing on MEAOX plate
