= Aspergillus asperescens =

Scientific classification
- Kingdom: Fungi
- Division: Ascomycota
- Class: Eurotiomycetes
- Order: Eurotiales
- Family: Aspergillaceae
- Genus: Aspergillus
- Species: A. asperescens

Binomial name
- Aspergillus asperescens Stolk (1954)

Species of fungus

Aspergillus asperescens is a species of fungus in the genus Aspergillus. It is from the Nidulantes section. The species was first described in 1954. It has been isolated from soil from a cave in England.

== Growth and morphology ==
A. asperescens has been cultivated on both Czapek yeast extract agar (CYA) plates and Malt Extract Agar Oxoid® (MEAOX) plates. The growth morphology of the colonies can be seen in the pictures below.

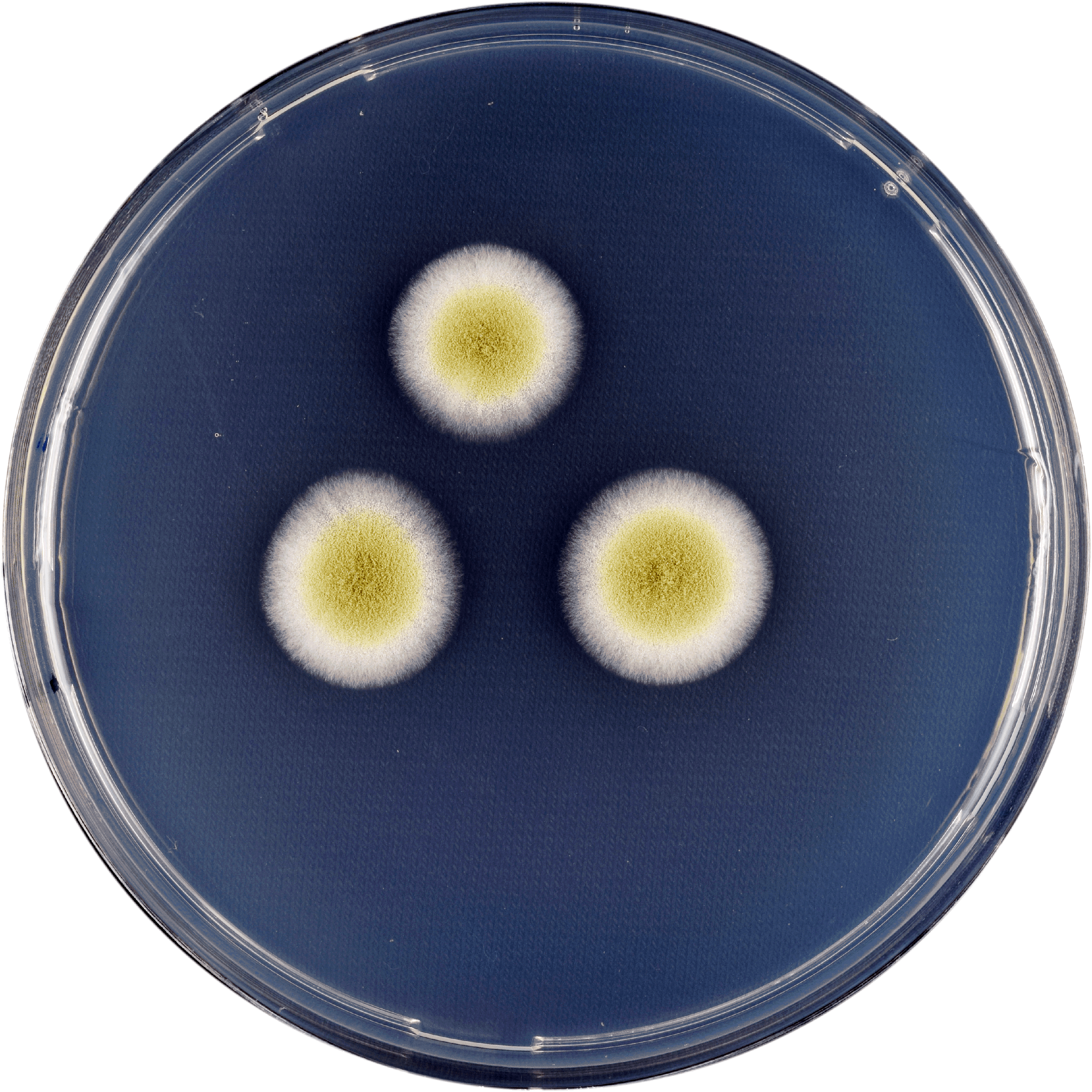
Aspergillus asperescens growing on CYA plate

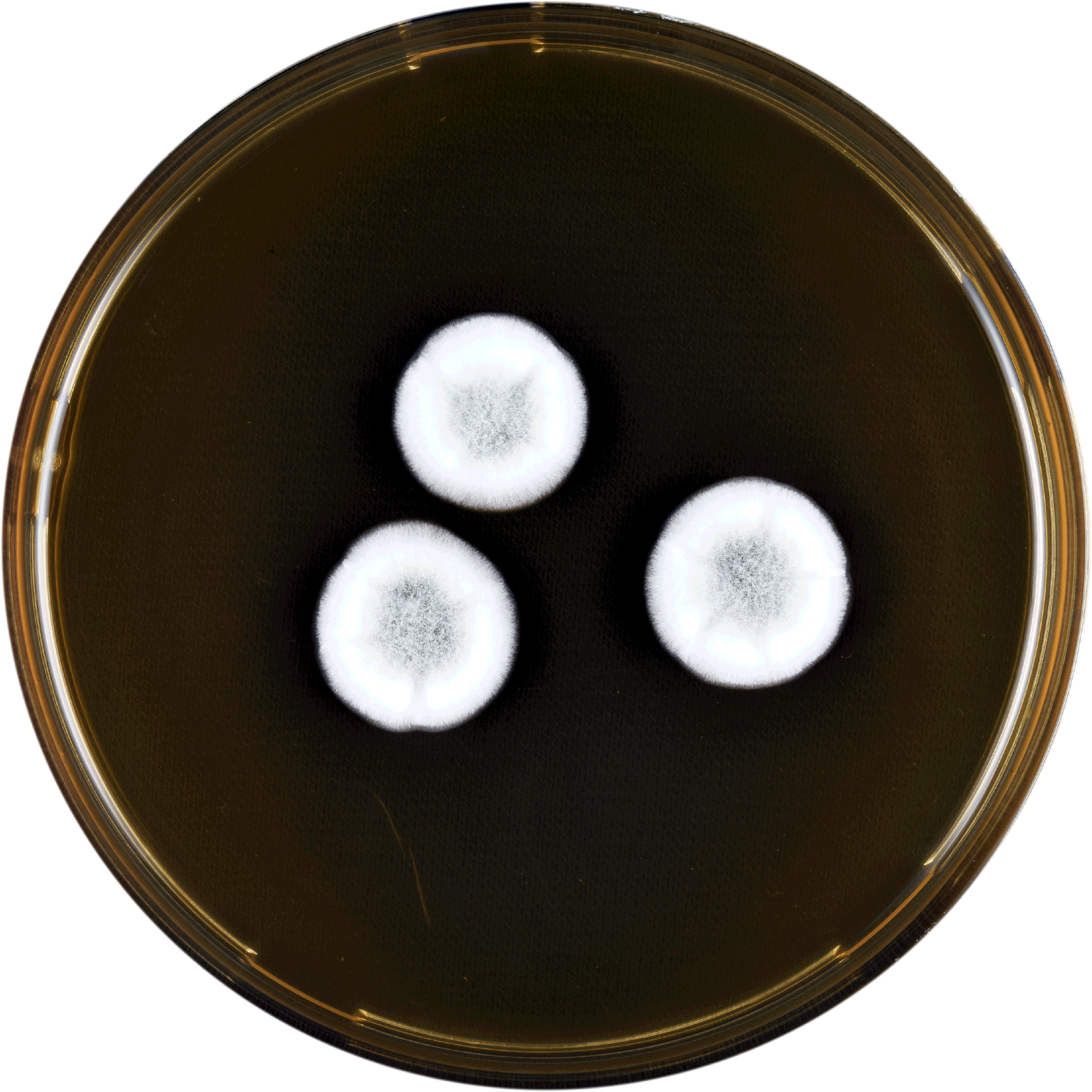
Aspergillus asperescens growing on MEAOX plate
