= Aspergillus varians =

Scientific classification
- Kingdom: Fungi
- Division: Ascomycota
- Class: Eurotiomycetes
- Order: Eurotiales
- Family: Aspergillaceae
- Genus: Aspergillus
- Species: A. varians

Binomial name
- Aspergillus varians Wehmer (1899)

Species of fungus

Aspergillus varians is a species of fungus in the genus Aspergillus. It is from the Nidulantes section. The species was first described in 1899.

== Growth and morphology ==
A. varians has been cultivated on both Czapek yeast extract agar (CYA) plates and Malt Extract Agar Oxoid® (MEAOX) plates. The growth morphology of the colonies can be seen in the pictures below.

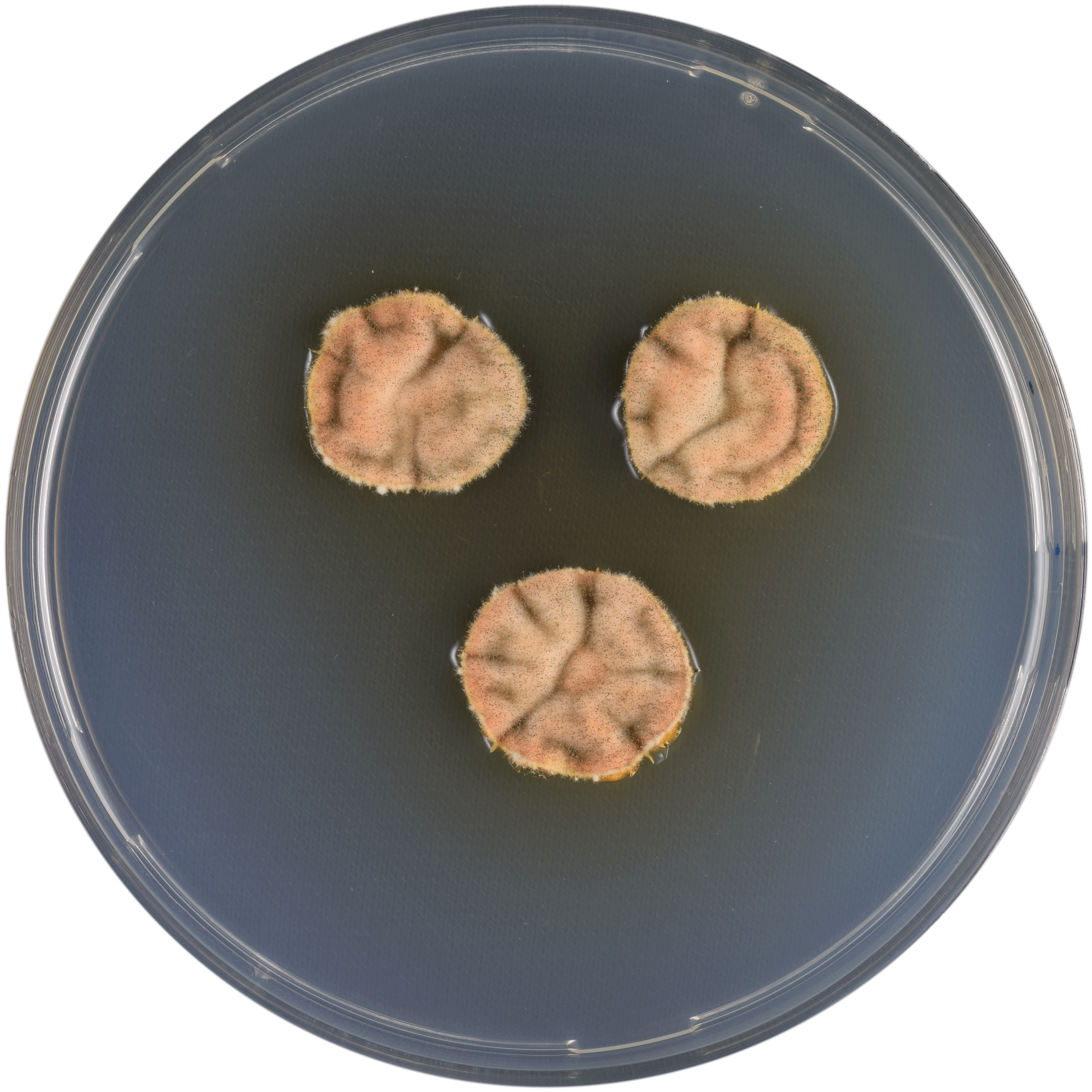
Aspergillus varians growing on CYA plate

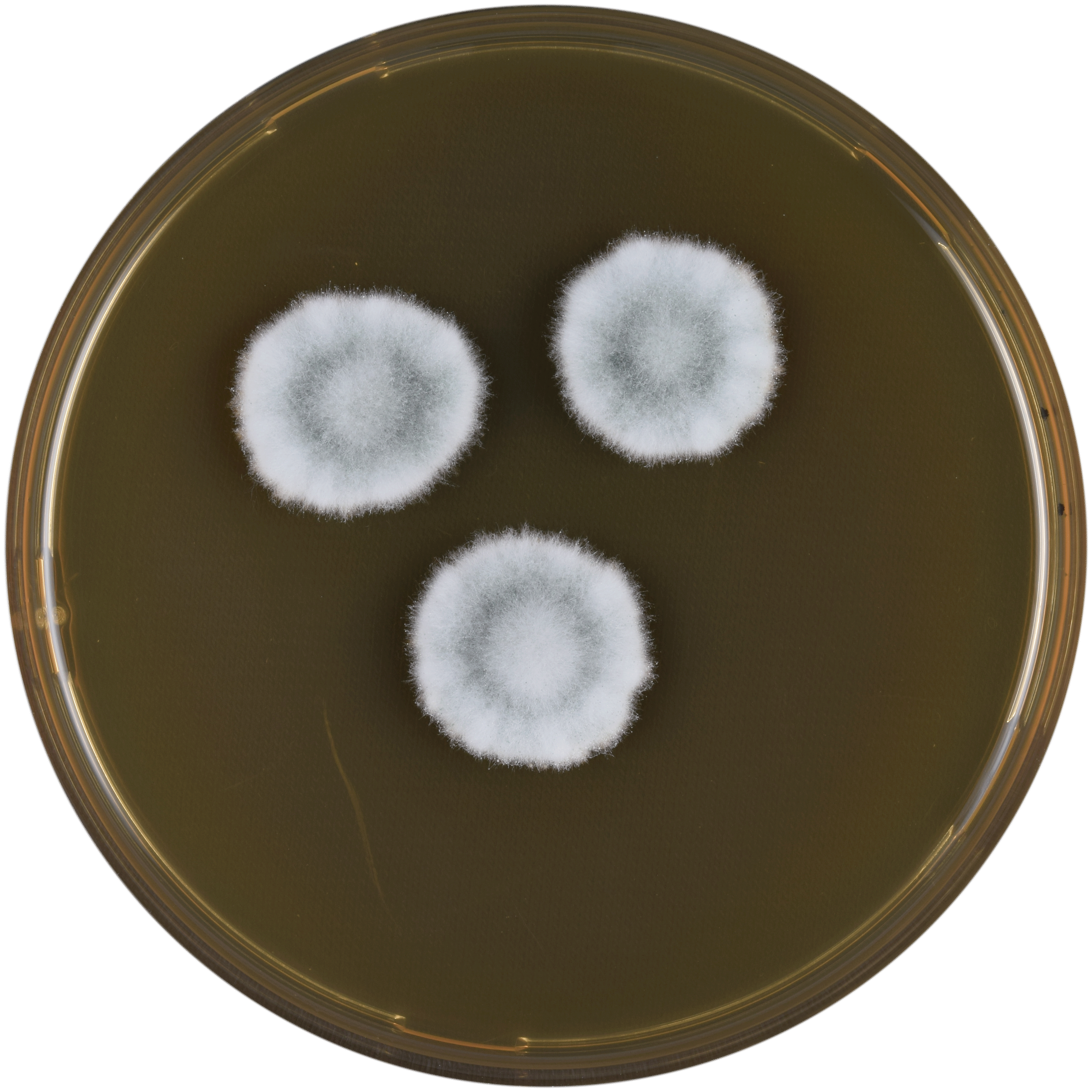
Aspergillus varians growing on MEAOX plate
