= List of Penicillium species =

List

This is a list of Penicillium species. The genus has over 300 species.

== Species ==
=== A ===
- Penicillium abidjanum
- Penicillium adametzii
- Penicillium adametzioides
- Penicillium aeris
- Penicillium aethiopicum
- Penicillium albicans
- Penicillium albidum
- Penicillium albocoremium
- Penicillium alexiae
- Penicillium alfredii
- Penicillium alicantinum
- Penicillium allahabadense
- Penicillium allii
- Penicillium allii-sativi
- Penicillium alogum
- Penicillium alutaceum
- Penicillium anatolicum
- Penicillium amagasakiense
- Penicillium amaliae
- Penicillium amphipolaria
- Penicillium anatolicum
- Penicillium angulare
- Penicillium angustiporcatum
- Penicillium antarcticum
- Penicillium annulatum
- Penicillium aotearoae
- Penicillium araracuarense
- Penicillium ardesiacum
- Penicillium arenicola
- Penicillium aragonense
- Penicillium arianeae
- Penicillium ardesiacum
- Penicillium arenicola
- Penicillium argentinense
- Penicillium armarii
- Penicillium astrolabium
- Penicillium asturianum
- Penicillium atramentosum
- Penicillium athertonense
- Penicillium atrolazulinum
- Penicillium attenuatum
- Penicillium atrosanguineum
- Penicillium atrovenetum
- Penicillium austricola
- Penicillium aurantiacobrunneum
- Penicillium aurantiogriseum
- Penicillium aureocephalum
- Penicillium austroafricanum
- Penicillium austrosinicum

=== B ===
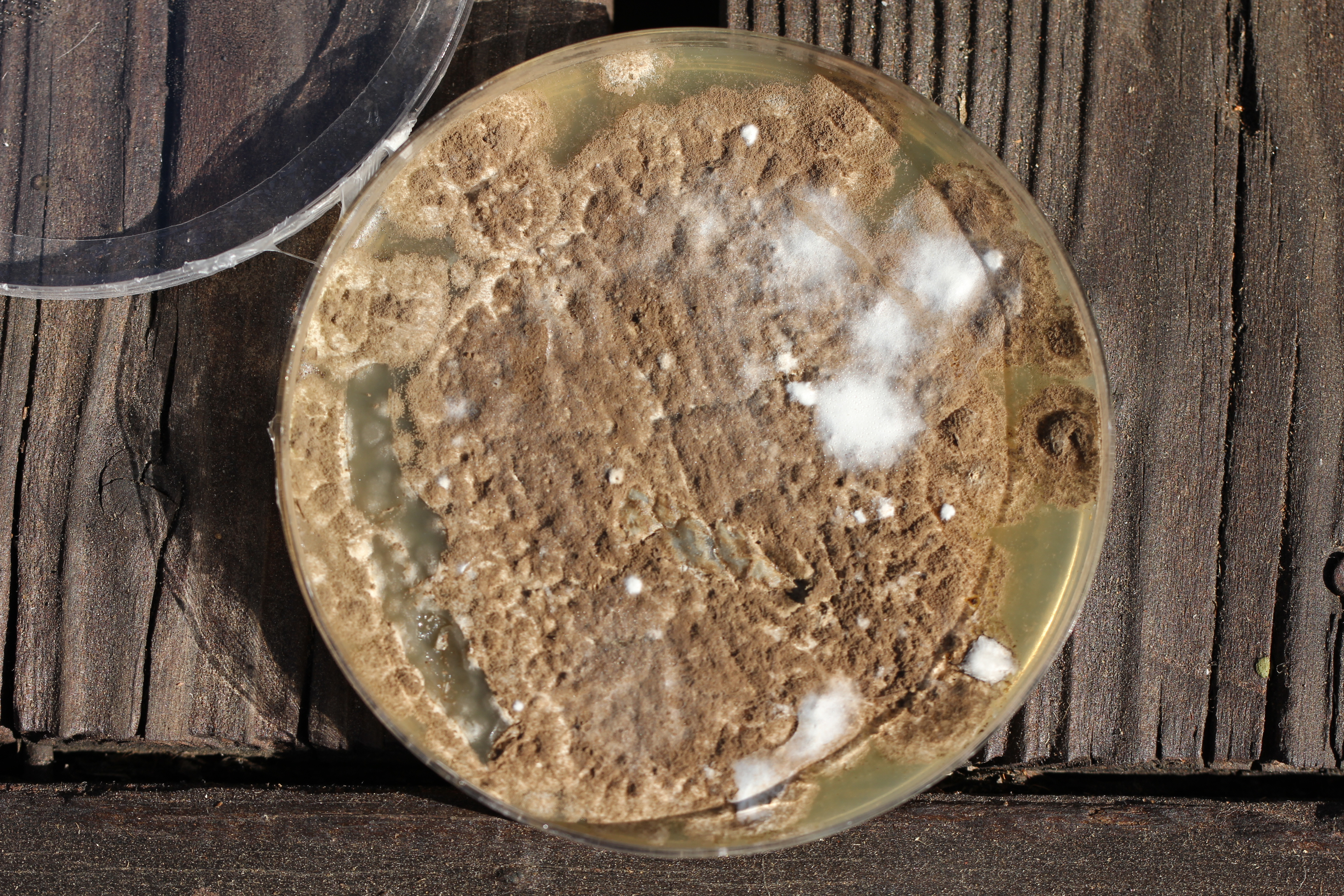
Penicillium brevicompactum

- Penicillium bilaiae
- Penicillium bissettii
- Penicillium boreae
- Penicillium bovifimosum
- Penicillium brasilianum
- Penicillium brasiliense
- Penicillium brefeldianum
- Penicillium brevicompactum
- Penicillium brevissimum
- Penicillium brevistipitatum
- Penicillium brocae
- Penicillium brunneoconidiatum
- Penicillium brunneum
- Penicillium buchwaldii
- Penicillium burgense
- Penicillium bussumense

=== C ===
- Penicillium caerulescens
- Penicillium cainii
- Penicillium cairnsense
- Penicillium calidicanium
- Penicillium camemberti
- Penicillium camponotum
- Penicillium canariense
- Penicillium canescens
- Penicillium canis
- Penicillium cantabricum
- Penicillium caperatum
- Penicillium capsulatum
- Penicillium carneum
- Penicillium cartierense
- Penicillium caseifulvum
- Penicillium catalonicum
- Penicillium cataractarum
- Penicillium catenatum
- Penicillium cavernicola
- Penicillium cecidicola
- Penicillium cellarum
- Penicillium chalabudae
- Penicillium chalybeum
- Penicillium charlesii
- Penicillium chermesinum
- Penicillium choerospondiatis
- Penicillium christenseniae
- Penicillium chroogomphum
- Penicillium chrysogenum
- Penicillium cinnamopurpureum
- Penicillium citrinum
- Penicillium citrioviride
- Penicillium clavigerum
- Penicillium clavistipitatum
- Penicillium claviforme
- Penicillium cluniae
- Penicillium coalescens
- Penicillium coccotrypicola
- Penicillium coeruleum
- Penicillium coffeae
- Penicillium columnare
- Penicillium commune
- Penicillium compactum
- Penicillium concentricum
- Penicillium confertum
- Penicillium contaminatum
- Penicillium coprobium
- Penicillium coprophilum
- Penicillium copticola
- Penicillium coralligerum
- Penicillium corylophilum
- Penicillium corynephorum
- Penicillium corvianum
- Penicillium cosmopolitanum
- Penicillium cremeogriseum
- Penicillium crustosum
- Penicillium cryptum
- Penicillium crystallinum
- Penicillium costaricense
- Penicillium cravenianum
- Penicillium curticaule
- Penicillium cvjetkovicii
- Penicillium cyaneum

=== D ===
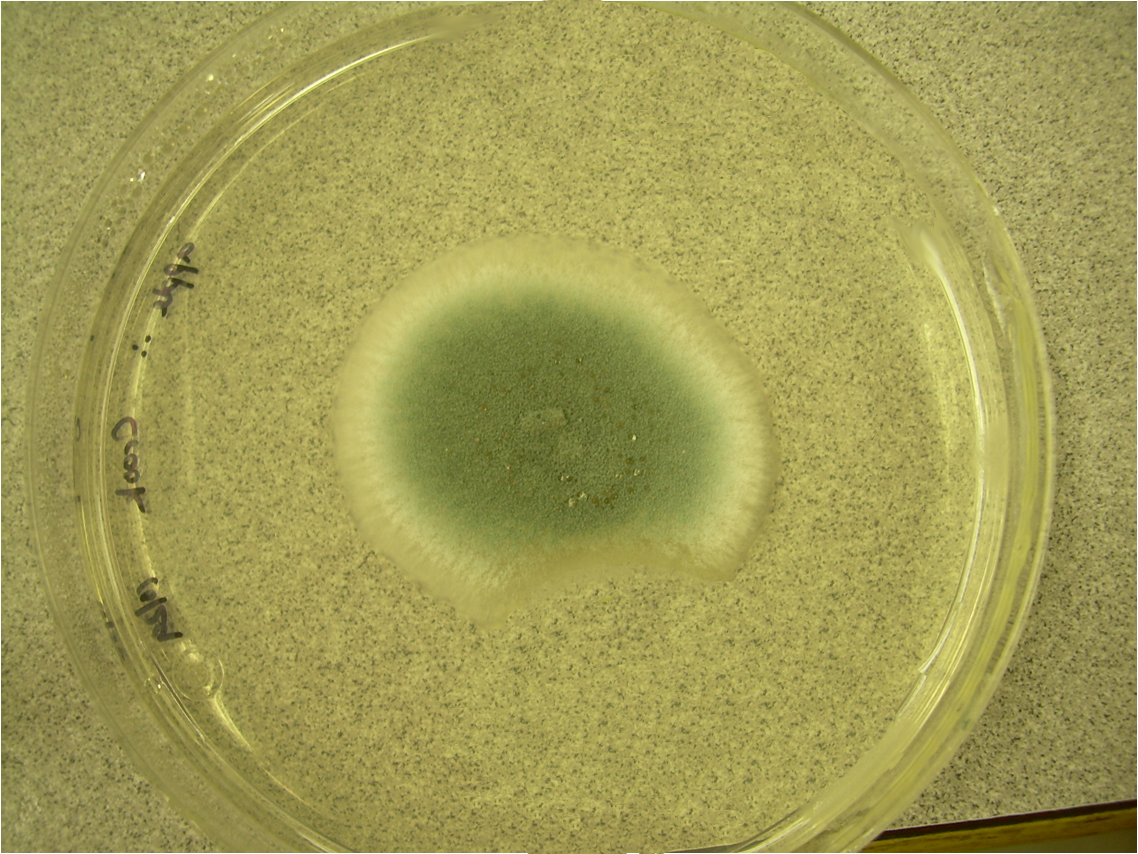
Penicillium digitatum

- Penicillium daejeonium
- Penicillium daleae
- Penicillium decaturense
- Penicillium decumbens
- Penicillium dendriticum
- Penicillium desertorum
- Penicillium diabolicalicense
- Penicillium dierckxii
- Penicillium digitatum
- Penicillium dimorphosporum
- Penicillium dipodomyicola
- Penicillium dipodomyis
- Penicillium discolor
- Penicillium diversum
- Penicillium dodgei
- Penicillium donkii
- Penicillium dravuni
- Penicillium duclauxii
- Penicillium dunedinense

=== E ===
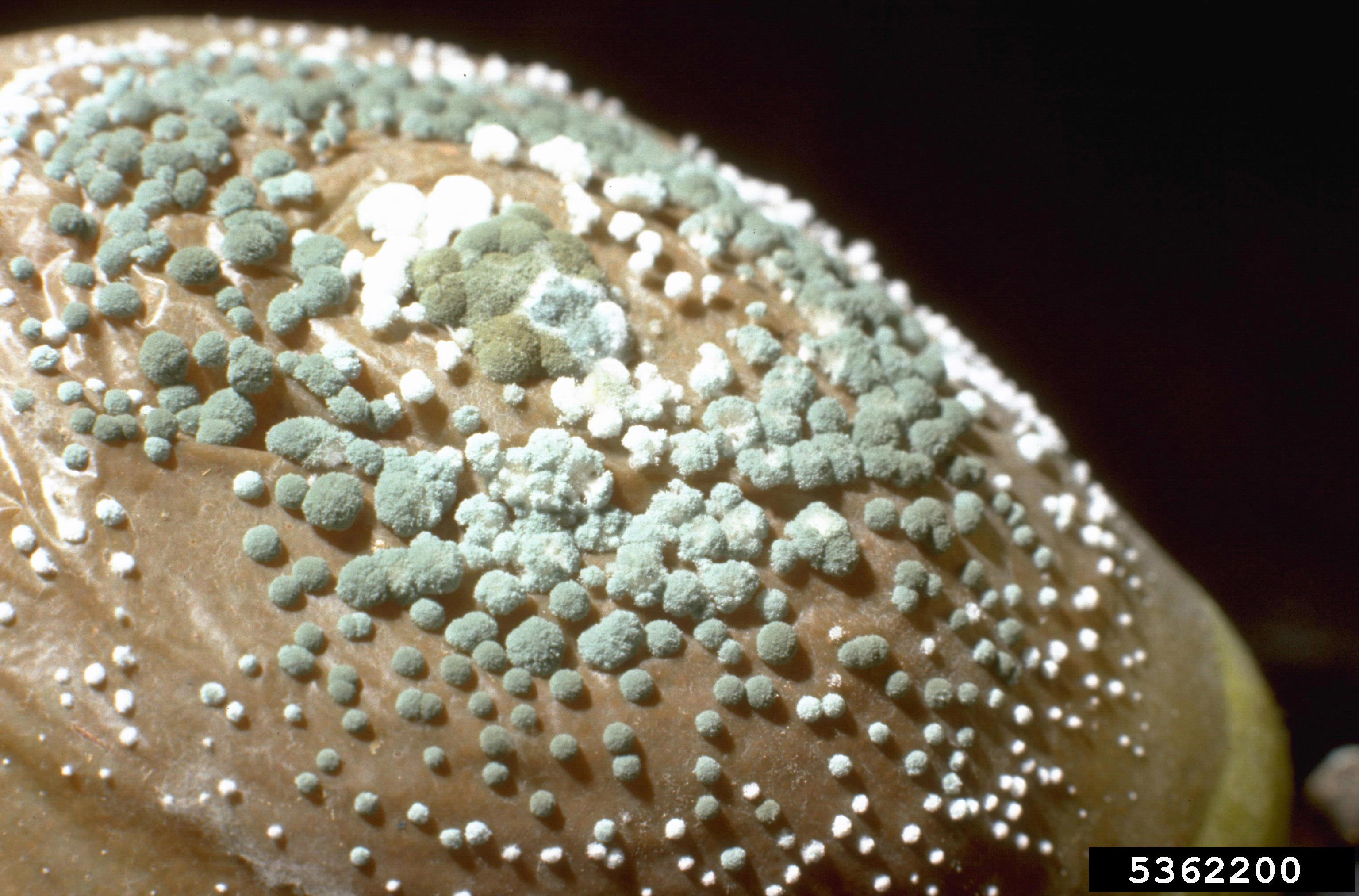
Penicillium expansum

- Penicillium echinulatum
- Penicillium elleniae
- Penicillium ellipsoideosporum
- Penicillium emmonsii
- Penicillium erubescens
- Penicillium euglaucum
- Penicillium erythromellis
- Penicillium estinogenum
- Penicillium excelsum
- Penicillium expansum

=== F ===
- Penicillium fasciculatum
- Penicillium fennelliae
- Penicillium fimorum
- Penicillium flavescens
- Penicillium flavidostipitatum
- Penicillium flavigenum
- Penicillium flavisclerotiatum
- Penicillium fluviserpens
- Penicillium formosanum
- Penicillium fractum
- Penicillium freii
- Penicillium funiculosum
- Penicillium fundyense
- Penicillium fusisporum

=== G ===
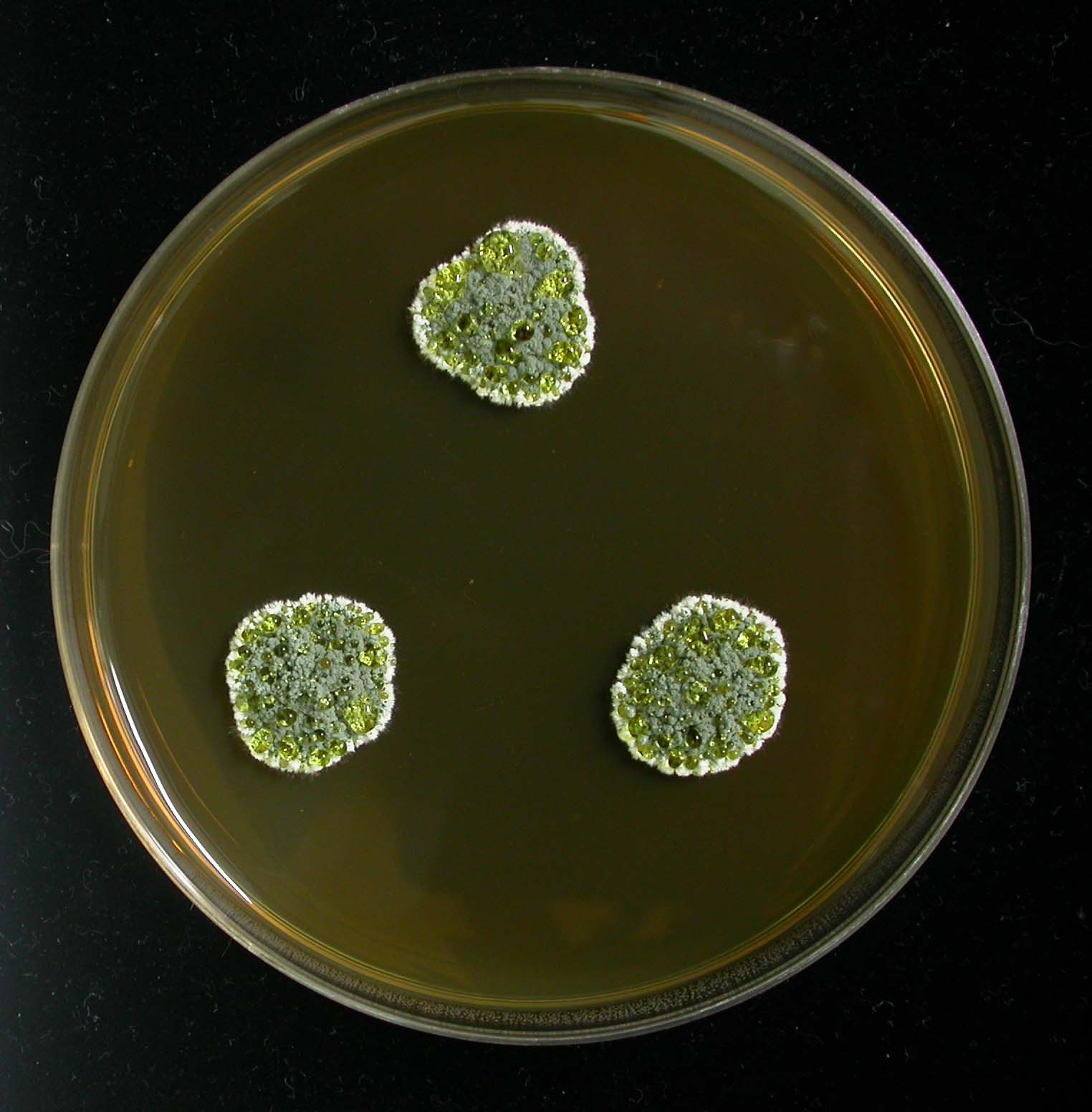
Penicillium glandicola

- Penicillium georgiense
- Penicillium giganteum
- Penicillium gladioli
- Penicillium glabrum
- Penicillium glandicola
- Penicillium glaucoalbidum
- Penicillium glaucum
- Penicillium glycyrrhizacola
- Penicillium goetzii
- Penicillium gossypii
- Penicillium gorlenkoanum
- Penicillium gracilentum
- Penicillium grevilleicola
- Penicillium griseofulvum
- Penicillium griseolum
- Penicillium griseopurpureum
- Penicillium griseum
- Penicillium guanacastense

=== H ===
- Penicillium halotolerans
- Penicillium hemitrachum
- Penicillium hennebertii
- Penicillium herquei
- Penicillium heteromorphum
- Penicillium hetheringtonii
- Penicillium hirayamae
- Penicillium hirsutum
- Penicillium hispanicum
- Penicillium humicola
- Penicillium hoeksii
- Penicillium hordei
- Penicillium humicoloides
- Penicillium humuli
- Penicillium hypomycetis

=== I ===
- Penicillium ianthinellum
- Penicillium idahoense
- Penicillium implicatum
- Penicillium improvisum
- Penicillium incoloratum
- Penicillium indonesiae
- Penicillium inflatum
- Penicillium intermedium
- Penicillium infra-aurantiacum
- Penicillium infrabuccalum
- Penicillium infrapurpureum
- Penicillium imranianum
- Penicillium inusitatum
- Penicillium isariiforme
- Penicillium islandicum
- Penicillium italicum

=== J ===
- Penicillium jacksonii
- Penicillium jamesonlandense
- Penicillium janczewskii
- Penicillium javanicum
- Penicillium jejuense
- Penicillium jensenii
- Penicillium jiangxiense
- Penicillium johnkrugii
- Penicillium jugoslavicum

=== K ===
- Penicillium kananaskense
- Penicillium kenraperi
- Penicillium kiamaense
- Penicillium klebahnii
- Penicillium kloeckeri
- Penicillium kojigenum
- Penicillium kongii
- Penicillium koreense

=== L ===
- Penicillium lacus-sarmientei
- Penicillium laeve
- Penicillium lapatayae
- Penicillium lapidosum
- Penicillium lassenii
- Penicillium lemhiflumine
- Penicillium lehmanii
- Penicillium lenticrescens
- Penicillium levitum
- Penicillium lignorum
- Penicillium limosum
- Penicillium lineatum
- Penicillium loliense
- Penicillium longicatenatum
- Penicillium ludwigii

=== M ===
- Penicillium macrosclerotiorum
- Penicillium maclennaniae
- Penicillium madriti
- Penicillium magnielliptisporum
- Penicillium malacaense
- Penicillium malacosphaerulum
- Penicillium mallochii
- Penicillium malmesburiense
- Penicillium mariae-crucis
- Penicillium marinum
- Penicillium marthae-christensenia
- Penicillium maximae
- Penicillium megasporum
- Penicillium melanoconidium
- Penicillium melinii
- Penicillium menonorum
- Penicillium meloforme
- Penicillium meridianum
- Penicillium mexicanum
- Penicillium miczynskii
- Penicillium momoii
- Penicillium mimosinum
- Penicillium minioluteum
- Penicillium moldavicum
- Penicillium molle
- Penicillium mononematosum
- Penicillium monsgalena
- Penicillium monsserratidens
- Penicillium montanense
- Penicillium multicolor
- Penicillium murcianum

=== N ===
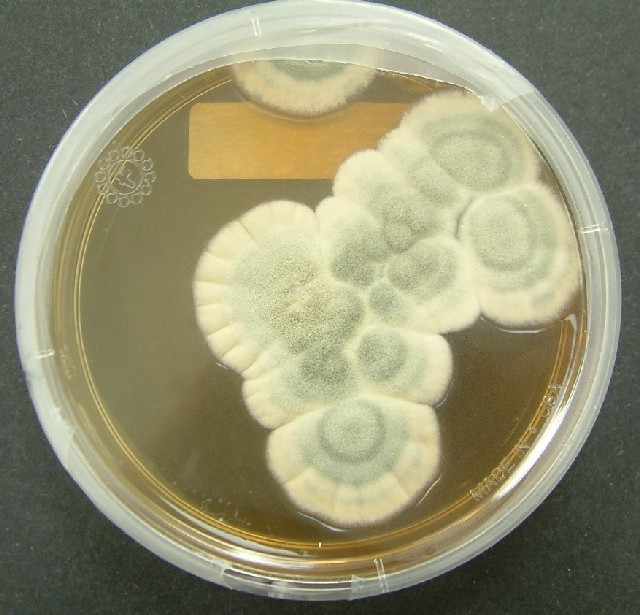
Penicillium notatum

- Penicillium nalgiovense
- Penicillium neocrassum
- Penicillium neoechinulatum
- Penicillium neomiczynskii
- Penicillium nepalense
- Penicillium nilense
- Penicillium nodositatum
- Penicillium nodulum
- Penicillium nordicum
- Penicillium nothofagi
- Penicillium novae-zelandiae
- Penicillium nucicola

=== O ===
- Penicillium ochotense
- Penicillium oblatum
- Penicillium occitanis
- Penicillium ochrochloron
- Penicillium ochrosalmoneum
- Penicillium olsonii
- Penicillium onobense
- Penicillium oregonense
- Penicillium ootensis
- Penicillium ornatum
- Penicillium ortum
- Penicillium osmophilum
- Penicillium ovatum
- Penicillium oxalicum

=== P ===
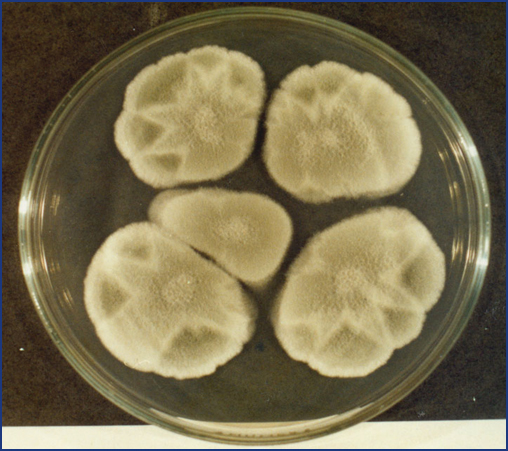
Penicillium purpurogenum

- Penicillium pagulum
- Penicillium pachmariensis
- Penicillium palitans
- Penicillium palmae
- Penicillium panamense
- Penicillium pancosmium
- Penicillium paneum
- Penicillium panissanguineum
- Penicillium paradoxum
- Penicillium parviverrucosum
- Penicillium parvofructum
- Penicillium parvulum
- Penicillium parvum
- Penicillium pasqualense
- Penicillium parmonense
- Penicillium patens
- Penicillium paxilli
- Penicillium pedernalense
- Penicillium penarojense
- Penicillium persicinum
- Penicillium philippinense
- Penicillium phoeniceum
- Penicillium piltunense
- Penicillium piceum
- Penicillium pimiteouiense
- Penicillium pinophilum
- Penicillium pinsaporum
- Penicillium polonicum
- Penicillium primulinum
- Penicillium proteolyticum
- Penicillium pseudostromaticum
- Penicillium psychrosexualis
- Penicillium pullum
- Penicillium pulvis
- Penicillium punicae
- Penicillium punicae
- Penicillium purpurescens
- Penicillium purpureum
- Penicillium purpurogenum

=== Q ===
- Penicillium qii
- Penicillium quebecense

=== R ===
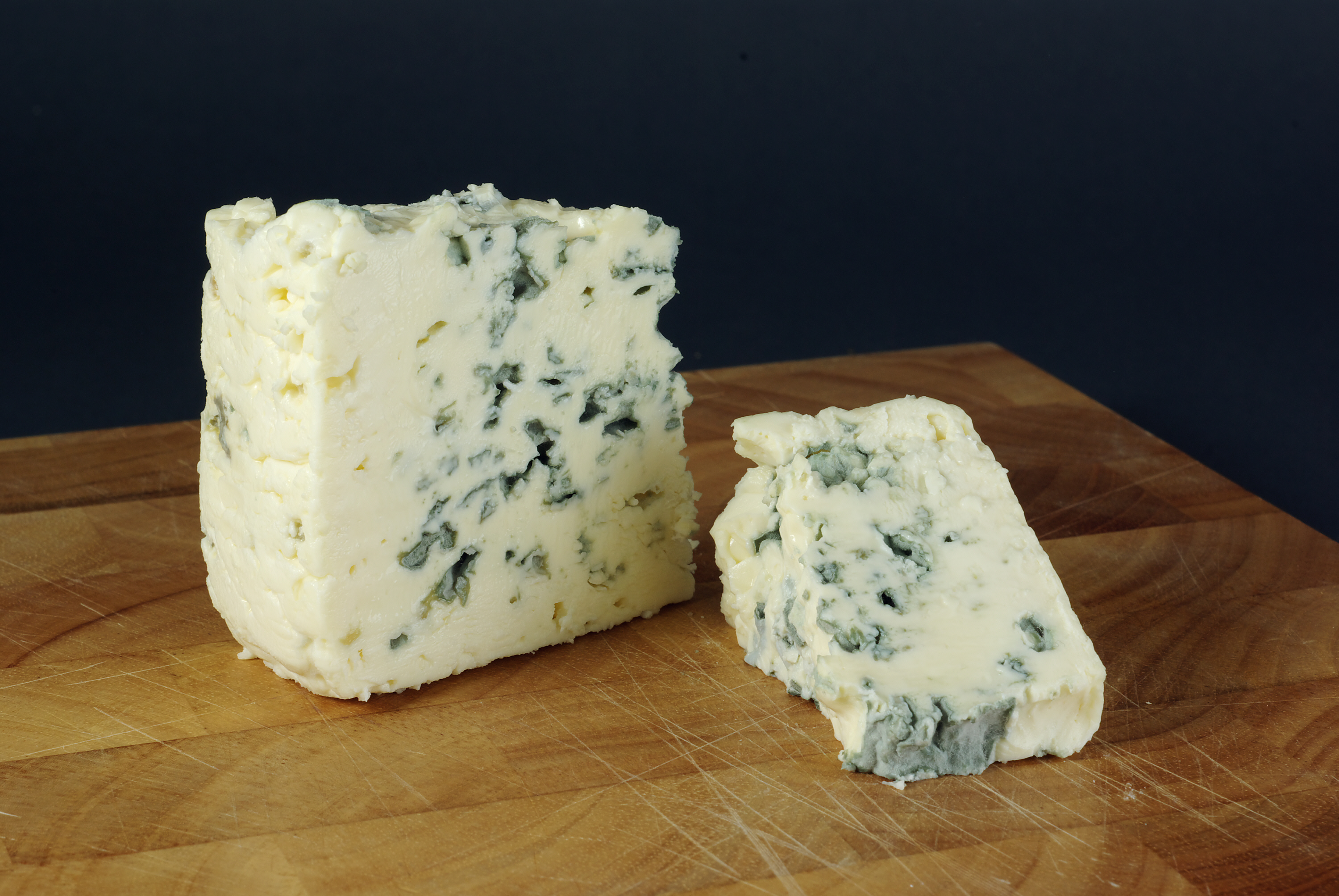
Penicillium roqueforti

- Penicillium raciborskii
- Penicillium rademirici
- Penicillium radicicola
- Penicillium radicum
- Penicillium raistrickii
- Penicillium ramusculum
- Penicillium ranomafanaense
- Penicillium raphiae
- Penicillium repensicola
- Penicillium rasile
- Penicillium resedanum
- Penicillium resticulosum
- Penicillium restingae
- Penicillium restrictum
- Penicillium ribium
- Penicillium riverlandense
- Penicillium robsamsonii
- Penicillium rolfsii
- Penicillium roqueforti
- Penicillium roseopurpureum
- Penicillium rubefaciens
- Penicillium rubens
- Penicillium rubidurum
- Penicillium rubrum
- Penicillium rudallense
- Penicillium rugulosum

=== S ===
- Penicillium sabulosum
- Penicillium sacculum
- Penicillium sajarovii
- Penicillium salamii
- Penicillium salmoniflumin
- Penicillium samsonianum
- Penicillium sanguifluum
- Penicillium sanshaense
- Penicillium saturniforme
- Penicillium scabrosum
- Penicillium sclerotigenum
- Penicillium senticosum
- Penicillium severskii
- Penicillium shennonghianum
- Penicillium siamense
- Penicillium simile
- Penicillium simplicissimum
- Penicillium sinaicum
- Penicillium singorense
- Penicillium sizovae
- Penicillium skrjabinii
- Penicillium smithii
- Penicillium solitum
- Penicillium soppii
- Penicillium spathulatum
- Penicillium sphaerum
- Penicillium spinulosum
- Penicillium spirillum
- Penicillium steckii
- Penicillium sterculiniicola
- Penicillium striatisporum
- Penicillium stolkiae
- Penicillium subarcticum
- Penicillium subericola
- Penicillium sublateritium
- Penicillium sublectaticum
- Penicillium subrubescens
- Penicillium subspinulosum
- Penicillium subturcoseum
- Penicillium subtile
- Penicillium sucrivorum
- Penicillium sumatrense
- Penicillium svalbardense
- Penicillium sylvaticum

=== T ===
- Penicillium tanzanicum
- Penicillium tardochrysogenum
- Penicillium tardum
- Penicillium tarraconense
- Penicillium tealii
- Penicillium terrenum
- Penicillium terrigenum
- Penicillium thiersii
- Penicillium thomii
- Penicillium thymicola
- Penicillium tricolor
- Penicillium tropicoides
- Penicillium tropicum
- Penicillium tsitsikammaense
- Penicillium tubakianum
- Penicillium tulipae
- Penicillium turbatum
- Penicillium turcosoconidiatum

=== U ===
- Penicillium ubiquetum
- Penicillium udagawae
- Penicillium ulaiense

=== V ===
- Penicillium vagum
- Penicillium vancouverense
- Penicillium vanbeymae
- Penicillium vanderhammenii
- Penicillium vanluykii
- Penicillium vanoranjei
- Penicillium variratens
- Penicillium variabile
- Penicillium vasconiae
- Penicillium velutinum
- Penicillium venetum
- Penicillium verhagenii
- Penicillium verrucisporum
- Penicillium verrucosum
- Penicillium verruculosum
- Penicillium vinaceum
- Penicillium virgatum
- Penicillium viridicatum
- Penicillium viticola

=== W ===
- Penicillium waksmanii
- Penicillium wellingtonense
- Penicillium westlingii
- Penicillium williamettense
- Penicillium wisconsinense
- Penicillium wollemiicola
- Penicillium wotroi

=== Y ===
- Penicillium yarmokense

=== Z ===
- Penicillium zhuangii
- Penicillium zonatum
