= Penicillium erubescens =

Scientific classification
- Kingdom: Fungi
- Division: Ascomycota
- Class: Eurotiomycetes
- Order: Eurotiales
- Family: Aspergillaceae
- Genus: Penicillium
- Species: P. erubescens

Binomial name
- Penicillium erubescens Scott, D.B. 1968

Type strain
- ATCC 18544, CBS 318.67, CSIR 1040, FRR 0814, IFO 31734, IMI 136204, NBRC 31734, NRRL 6223

Synonyms
- Eupenicillium erubescens

Species of fungus

Penicillium erubescens is an anamorph species of the genus of Penicillium.

== See also ==
- List of Penicillium species
