= Penicillium contaminatum =

Scientific classification
- Domain: Eukaryota
- Kingdom: Fungi
- Division: Ascomycota
- Class: Eurotiomycetes
- Order: Eurotiales
- Family: Aspergillaceae
- Genus: Penicillium
- Species: P. contaminatum

Binomial name
- Penicillium contaminatum Houbraken, 2014

Type strain
- CBS 345.52, DTO 091-A3, IMI 049057

Species of fungus

Penicillium contaminatum is a fungus species of the genus of Penicillium.

== See also ==
- List of Penicillium species
