= Penicillium ardesiacum =

Scientific classification
- Domain: Eukaryota
- Kingdom: Fungi
- Division: Ascomycota
- Class: Eurotiomycetes
- Order: Eurotiales
- Family: Aspergillaceae
- Genus: Penicillium
- Species: P. ardesiacum

Binomial name
- Penicillium ardesiacum Novobranova, Novosti Sistematiki, Nizshikh Rastenii 1974

Type strain
- ATCC 24719, BKM F-1749, CBS 497.73, FRR 1479, IFO 30540, IMI 174719, NBRC 30540, VKM F-1749

Species of fungus

Penicillium ardesiacum is an anamorph fungus species of the genus of Penicillium.

== See also ==
- List of Penicillium species
