= Penicillium caperatum =

Scientific classification
- Kingdom: Fungi
- Division: Ascomycota
- Class: Eurotiomycetes
- Order: Eurotiales
- Family: Aspergillaceae
- Genus: Penicillium
- Species: P. caperatum

Binomial name
- Penicillium caperatum Udagawa, S.I.; Horie, Y. 1973

Synonyms
- Eupenicillium caperatum (teleomorph)

Species of fungus

Penicillium caperatum is an anamorph fungus species of the genus of Penicillium which was isolated from soil in Papua New Guinea.

== See also ==
- List of Penicillium species
