= Penicillium aragonense =

Scientific classification
- Kingdom: Fungi
- Division: Ascomycota
- Class: Eurotiomycetes
- Order: Eurotiales
- Family: Aspergillaceae
- Genus: Penicillium
- Species: P. aragonense

Binomial name
- Penicillium aragonense C. Ramírez & A.T. Martinez 1981

Type strain
- ATCC 42228, BCRC 32951, CBS 171.81, CCRC 32951, IJFM 5072, IMI 253790, KCTC 6545, VKM F-2186

Species of fungus

Penicillium aragonense is an anamorph fungus species of the genus of Penicillium.

== See also ==
- List of Penicillium species
