= Penicillium caerulescens =

Scientific classification
- Domain: Eukaryota
- Kingdom: Fungi
- Division: Ascomycota
- Class: Eurotiomycetes
- Order: Eurotiales
- Family: Aspergillaceae
- Genus: Penicillium
- Species: P. caerulescens

Binomial name
- Penicillium caerulescens Quintanilla, J.A. 1983

Species of fungus

Penicillium caerulescens is a fungus species of the genus of Penicillium which was isolated from soil.

== See also ==
- List of Penicillium species
