= Penicillium corynephorum =

Scientific classification
- Kingdom: Fungi
- Division: Ascomycota
- Class: Eurotiomycetes
- Order: Eurotiales
- Family: Aspergillaceae
- Genus: Penicillium
- Species: P. corynephorum

Binomial name
- Penicillium corynephorum Pitt & A.D. Hocking 1985

Type strain
- CBS 256.87, FRR 2663, IMI 288724 ATCC 56976

Species of fungus

Penicillium corynephorum is an anamorph species of the genus of Penicillium.

== See also ==
- List of Penicillium species
