= Penicillium flavisclerotiatum =

Scientific classification
- Domain: Eukaryota
- Kingdom: Fungi
- Division: Ascomycota
- Class: Eurotiomycetes
- Order: Eurotiales
- Family: Aspergillaceae
- Genus: Penicillium
- Species: P. flavisclerotiatum

Binomial name
- Penicillium flavisclerotiatum Visagie, Houbraken & K. Jacobs 2014

Type strain
- CBS 137750, CV 100, CV0100, DAOM 241157, DTO 180-I8, CMV-2013d

Species of fungus

Penicillium flavisclerotiatum is a species of the genus of Penicillium which was isolated from soil of the Stellenbosch mountain in Fynbos in South Africa.

== See also ==
- List of Penicillium species
