= Penicillium canariense =

Scientific classification
- Kingdom: Fungi
- Division: Ascomycota
- Class: Eurotiomycetes
- Order: Eurotiales
- Family: Aspergillaceae
- Genus: Penicillium
- Species: P. canariense

Binomial name
- Penicillium canariense Peterson, S.W.; Sigler, L. 2002

Type strain
- BPI 841396, NRRL 31003, UAMH 6403

Species of fungus

Penicillium canariense is a fungus species of the genus of Penicillium.

== See also ==
- List of Penicillium species
