= Penicillium astrolabium =

Scientific classification
- Domain: Eukaryota
- Kingdom: Fungi
- Division: Ascomycota
- Class: Eurotiomycetes
- Order: Eurotiales
- Family: Aspergillaceae
- Genus: Penicillium
- Species: P. astrolabium

Binomial name
- Penicillium astrolabium R. Serra & S.W. Peterson 2007

Species of fungus

Penicillium astrolabium is a fungus species of the genus of Penicillium.

== See also ==
- List of Penicillium species
