= Penicillium cartierense =

Scientific classification
- Domain: Eukaryota
- Kingdom: Fungi
- Division: Ascomycota
- Class: Eurotiomycetes
- Order: Eurotiales
- Family: Aspergillaceae
- Genus: Penicillium
- Species: P. cartierense

Binomial name
- Penicillium cartierense Houbraken 2014

Type strain
- CBS 137956

Species of fungus

Penicillium cartierense is a fungus species of the genus of Penicillium which is named after Cartierheide in the Netherlands where this species was first found.

== See also ==
- List of Penicillium species
