= Penicillium aurantiacobrunneum =

Scientific classification
- Kingdom: Fungi
- Division: Ascomycota
- Class: Eurotiomycetes
- Order: Eurotiales
- Family: Aspergillaceae
- Genus: Penicillium
- Species: P. aurantiacobrunneum

Binomial name
- Penicillium aurantiacobrunneum Houbraken, Frisvad & Samson 2011

Type strain
- CBS 126277, CBS 126228, CBS 126229, CBS 126230

Species of fungus

Penicillium aurantiacobrunneum is a fungus species of the genus of Penicillium.

== See also ==
- List of Penicillium species
