= Penicillium anatolicum =

Scientific classification
- Kingdom: Fungi
- Division: Ascomycota
- Class: Eurotiomycetes
- Order: Eurotiales
- Family: Aspergillaceae
- Genus: Penicillium
- Species: P. anatolicum

Binomial name
- Penicillium anatolicum Stolk, Antonie van Leeuwenhoek 1968

Type strain
- ATCC 18621, CBS 478.66, CSIR 940, IFO 31729, IMI 136242, NBRC 31729

Synonyms
- Eupenicillium anatolicum

Species of fungus

Penicillium anatolicum is a fungus species of the genus of Penicillium which was isolated in Turkey, Florida, in the United States and in South Africa.

== See also ==
- List of Penicillium species
