= Penicillium cryptum =

Scientific classification
- Kingdom: Fungi
- Division: Ascomycota
- Class: Eurotiomycetes
- Order: Eurotiales
- Family: Aspergillaceae
- Genus: Penicillium
- Species: P. cryptum

Binomial name
- Penicillium cryptum Gochenaur, S.E.; Cochrane, E. 1986

Type strain
- 769, ATCC 60138, CBS 271.89, FRR 3106, IMI 296794, NRRL 13460

Synonyms
- Eupenicillium cryptum

Species of fungus

Penicillium cryptum is a species of the genus of Penicillium.

== See also ==
- List of Penicillium species
