= Penicillium daleae =

Scientific classification
- Kingdom: Fungi
- Division: Ascomycota
- Class: Eurotiomycetes
- Order: Eurotiales
- Family: Aspergillaceae
- Genus: Penicillium
- Species: P. daleae

Binomial name
- Penicillium daleae K.M. Zalessky 1927

Type strain
- 260-5034.116, ATCC 10435, ATCC 74115, BCRC 32591, Biourge 306, CBS 211.28, CCRC 32591, DSM 2449, FRR 2025, IFO 6087, IFO 9072, IMI 034910, MF1134, MUCL 29234, NBRC 6087, NBRC 9072, NRRL 2025, NRRL 6059, Peoria 920, QM 7551, Thom 5010.6

Synonyms
- Penicillium krzemieniewskii

Species of fungus

Penicillium daleae is a species of the genus of Penicillium which was isolated from soil under conifers in Poland.

== See also ==
- List of Penicillium species
