= Penicillium coralligerum =

Scientific classification
- Domain: Eukaryota
- Kingdom: Fungi
- Division: Ascomycota
- Class: Eurotiomycetes
- Order: Eurotiales
- Family: Aspergillaceae
- Genus: Penicillium
- Species: P. coralligerum

Binomial name
- Penicillium coralligerum Nicot, J. & Pionnat, J.C. 1962

Type strain
- ATCC 16968, CBS 123.65, FRR 3465, IFO 9578, IHEM 4511, IMI 099159, LCP 58.1674, MUCL 31320, MUCL 34588, NBRC 9578, NRRL 3465, Pu 58

Species of fungus

Penicillium coralligerum is a species of the genus of Penicillium. It is a marine species sometimes referred to as a deep-sea fungus and in some languages named the equivalent of "deep-sea mold".

== See also ==
- List of Penicillium species
