= Penicillium clavistipitatum =

Scientific classification
- Domain: Eukaryota
- Kingdom: Fungi
- Division: Ascomycota
- Class: Eurotiomycetes
- Order: Eurotiales
- Family: Aspergillaceae
- Genus: Penicillium
- Species: P. clavistipitatum

Binomial name
- Penicillium clavistipitatum Visagie, Houbraken & K. Jacobs 2014

Type strain
- CBS 138650, CV 336, DAOM 241092, DTO 182-E5, KAS 4112, CMV-2013e

Species of fungus

Penicillium clavistipitatum is a fungus species of the genus of Penicillium.

== See also ==
- List of Penicillium species
