= Penicillium canis =

Scientific classification
- Domain: Eukaryota
- Kingdom: Fungi
- Division: Ascomycota
- Class: Eurotiomycetes
- Order: Eurotiales
- Family: Aspergillaceae
- Genus: Penicillium
- Species: P. canis

Binomial name
- Penicillium canis S. W. Peterson, 2014

Type strain
- BPI 892763, NRRL 62798

Species of fungus

Penicillium canis is a fungus species of the genus of Penicillium which was isolated from a dog which suffered from osteomyelitis.

== See also ==
- List of Penicillium species
