= Penicillium athertonense =

Scientific classification
- Domain: Eukaryota
- Kingdom: Fungi
- Division: Ascomycota
- Class: Eurotiomycetes
- Order: Eurotiales
- Family: Aspergillaceae
- Genus: Penicillium
- Species: P. athertonense

Binomial name
- Penicillium athertonense Houbraken 2014

Type strain
- CBS 138161

Species of fungus

Penicillium athertonense is a fungus species of the genus of Penicillium which is named after Atherton Tablelands where this species was found.

== See also ==
- List of Penicillium species
