= Penicillium capsulatum =

Scientific classification
- Kingdom: Fungi
- Division: Ascomycota
- Class: Eurotiomycetes
- Order: Eurotiales
- Family: Aspergillaceae
- Genus: Penicillium
- Species: P. capsulatum

Binomial name
- Penicillium capsulatum Raper, K.B.; Fennell, D.I. 1948

Type strain
- ATCC 10420, BCRC 32727, CBS 301.48, CCRC 32727, Cz 10, DSM 2210, FRR 2056, IJFM 5120, IMI 040576, MUCL 38792, NRRL 2056, NRRL A-1073, QM 4869, VKM F-445

Species of fungus

Penicillium capsulatum is an anamorph fungus species of the genus of Penicillium which was isolated from Panama.

== See also ==
- List of Penicillium species
