= Penicillium cainii =

Scientific classification
- Kingdom: Fungi
- Division: Ascomycota
- Class: Eurotiomycetes
- Order: Eurotiales
- Family: Aspergillaceae
- Genus: Penicillium
- Species: P. cainii

Binomial name
- Penicillium cainii Rivera, K.G.; Seifert, K.A. 2011

Species of fungus

Penicillium cainii is a fungus species of the genus of Penicillium which was isolated from soil in Korea.

== See also ==
- List of Penicillium species
