= Penicillium donkii =

Scientific classification
- Kingdom: Fungi
- Division: Ascomycota
- Class: Eurotiomycetes
- Order: Eurotiales
- Family: Aspergillaceae
- Genus: Penicillium
- Species: P. donkii

Binomial name
- Penicillium donkii Stolk, A.C. 1973

Type strain
- ATCC 48439, BCRC 31694, CBS 188.72, CCRC 31694, FRR 1738, IFO 31746, IHEM 5841, IMI 197489, KCTC 6418, MUCL 31188, NBRC 31746, NRRL 5562, NRRL A-20539

Species of fungus

Penicillium donkii is an anamorph species of the genus of Penicillium.

== See also ==
- List of Penicillium species
