= Penicillium adametzii =

Scientific classification
- Kingdom: Fungi
- Division: Ascomycota
- Class: Eurotiomycetes
- Order: Eurotiales
- Family: Aspergillaceae
- Genus: Penicillium
- Species: P. adametzii

Binomial name
- Penicillium adametzii K.M. Zalessky 1927

Type strain
- NRRL 737, IMI 039751, CBS 209.28, ATCC 10407

Species of fungus

Penicillium adametzii is an anamorph fungus species of the genus of Penicillium.

== See also ==
- List of Penicillium species
