= Penicillium atrovenetum =

Scientific classification
- Domain: Eukaryota
- Kingdom: Fungi
- Division: Ascomycota
- Class: Eurotiomycetes
- Order: Eurotiales
- Family: Aspergillaceae
- Genus: Penicillium
- Species: P. atrovenetum

Binomial name
- Penicillium atrovenetum Smith, G. 1956

Type strain
- ATCC 13352, BCRC 32952, CBS 241.56, CCRC 32952, FRR 2571, IFO 8138, IMI 061837, LSHB Sm683, NBRC 8138, NRRL 2571, NRRL A-5543, NRRL A-7009, QM 6963, SM-683, WB 4071

Species of fungus

Penicillium atrovenetum is a fungus species of the genus of Penicillium.

== See also ==
- List of Penicillium species
