= Penicillium catenatum =

Scientific classification
- Kingdom: Fungi
- Division: Ascomycota
- Class: Eurotiomycetes
- Order: Eurotiales
- Family: Aspergillaceae
- Genus: Penicillium
- Species: P. catenatum

Binomial name
- Penicillium catenatum D.B. Scott 1968

Type strain
- ATCC 18543, CBS 352.67, CSIR 1097, FRR 1160, IFO 31774, IFO 9577, IMI 136241, NBRC 31774, NBRC 9577

Synonyms
- Penicillium tularense; Eupenicillium catenatum (teleomorph)

Species of fungus

Penicillium catenatum is an anamorph fungus species of the genus of Penicillium.

== See also ==
- List of Penicillium species
