= Penicillium emmonsii =

Scientific classification
- Kingdom: Fungi
- Division: Ascomycota
- Class: Eurotiomycetes
- Order: Eurotiales
- Family: Aspergillaceae
- Genus: Penicillium
- Species: P. emmonsii

Binomial name
- Penicillium emmonsii Pitt, J.I. 1979

Type strain
- ATCC 10500, BCRC 32589, CBS 375.48, CCM F-174, CCRC 32589, FRR 1006, IFO 9186, IMI 039805, IMI 039805ii, MUCL 38776, NBRC 9186, NRRL 1006, QM 6759, Thom 5217.10, VKM F-2090, WB 1006

Species of fungus

Penicillium emmonsii is a species of the genus of Penicillium.

== See also ==
- List of Penicillium species
