= Penicillium decaturense =

Scientific classification
- Domain: Eukaryota
- Kingdom: Fungi
- Division: Ascomycota
- Class: Eurotiomycetes
- Order: Eurotiales
- Family: Aspergillaceae
- Genus: Penicillium
- Species: P. decaturense

Binomial name
- Penicillium decaturense S.W. Peterson, E.M. Bayer & Wicklow 2005

Type strain
- CBS 117509

Synonyms
- Penicillium decanturense, Penicillium decutarense

Species of fungus

Penicillium decaturense is a species of the genus of Penicillium which was isolated from a fungus in North America. Penicillium decaturense produces citrinin, 15-Deoxyoxalicine B, decaturins A and decaturins A

== See also ==
- List of Penicillium species
