= Penicillium coeruleum =

Scientific classification
- Domain: Eukaryota
- Kingdom: Fungi
- Division: Ascomycota
- Class: Eurotiomycetes
- Order: Eurotiales
- Family: Aspergillaceae
- Genus: Penicillium
- Species: P. coeruleum

Binomial name
- Penicillium coeruleum Sopp

Type strain
- CBS 141.45, NCTC 6595

Species of fungus

Penicillium coeruleum is a fungus species of the genus of Penicillium.

== See also ==
- List of Penicillium species
