= Penicillium dimorphosporum =

Scientific classification
- Kingdom: Fungi
- Division: Ascomycota
- Class: Eurotiomycetes
- Order: Eurotiales
- Family: Aspergillaceae
- Genus: Penicillium
- Species: P. dimorphosporum

Binomial name
- Penicillium dimorphosporum Swart, H.J. 1970

Type strain
- 71.05, ATCC 22783, ATCC 52501, CBS 456.70, FRR 1120, IMI 149680

Species of fungus

Penicillium dimorphosporum is an anamorph species of the genus of Penicillium.

== See also ==
- List of Penicillium species
