= Penicillium arenicola =

Scientific classification
- Domain: Eukaryota
- Kingdom: Fungi
- Division: Ascomycota
- Class: Eurotiomycetes
- Order: Eurotiales
- Family: Aspergillaceae
- Genus: Penicillium
- Species: P. arenicola

Binomial name
- Penicillium arenicola Chalab. 1950

Type strain
- ATCC 18321, ATCC 18330, CBS 220.66, CGMCC 3.4471, DSM 2435, FRR 3392, FRR 33923, IAM 13823, IMI 117658, JCM 9929, KCTC 6388, NRRL 3392, Pitt 1035, Pitt, 1035, VKM F-1035

Synonyms
- Penicillium canadense

Species of fungus

Penicillium arenicola is an anamorph fungus species of the genus of Penicillium which was isolated from pine forest soil in Russia.

== See also ==
- List of Penicillium species
