= Penicillium asturianum =

Scientific classification
- Domain: Eukaryota
- Kingdom: Fungi
- Division: Ascomycota
- Class: Eurotiomycetes
- Order: Eurotiales
- Family: Aspergillaceae
- Genus: Penicillium
- Species: P. asturianum

Binomial name
- Penicillium asturianum C. Ramírez & A.T. Martinez 1981

Type strain
- ATCC 42226, CBS 173.81, IJFM 3871, IMI 253788, KCTC 6546, VKM F-2184

Species of fungus

Penicillium asturianum is an anamorph fungus species of the genus of Penicillium.

== See also ==
- List of Penicillium species
