= Penicillium adametzioides =

Scientific classification
- Kingdom: Fungi
- Division: Ascomycota
- Class: Eurotiomycetes
- Order: Eurotiales
- Family: Aspergillaceae
- Genus: Penicillium
- Species: P. adametzioides

Binomial name
- Penicillium adametzioides S. Abe ex G. Smith 1963

Type strain
- ATCC 18306, BCRC 31547, CBS 313.59, CCRC 31547, CMI 68227, FAT 1302, FRR 3405, IFO 6055, IHEM 5833, IMI 068227, KCTC 6411, MUCL 31183, NBRC 6055, NRRL 3405, NRRL A-13114, QM 7312

Species of fungus

Penicillium adametzioides is an anamorph fungus species of the genus of Penicillium, which was isolated from decayed Grapes in Cheongsoo in Korea.

== See also ==
- List of Penicillium species
