= Penicillium allii-sativi =

Scientific classification
- Kingdom: Fungi
- Division: Ascomycota
- Class: Eurotiomycetes
- Order: Eurotiales
- Family: Aspergillaceae
- Genus: Penicillium
- Species: P. allii-sativi

Binomial name
- Penicillium allii-sativi Frisvad, Houbraken & Samson (2012)

Species of fungus

Penicillium allii-sativi is a fungus species of the genus Penicillium, section Chrysogena. It is one of several Penicillium species that can produce penicillin in culture. The fungus has been found in Argentina, Bulgaria, France, Portugal, South Africa, and the United Kingdom. The specific epithet allii-sativi refers to the garlic plant, Allium sativum, from which the fungus was isolated.

== See also ==
- List of Penicillium species
