= Penicillium dodgei =

Scientific classification
- Domain: Eukaryota
- Kingdom: Fungi
- Division: Ascomycota
- Class: Eurotiomycetes
- Order: Eurotiales
- Family: Aspergillaceae
- Genus: Penicillium
- Species: P. dodgei

Binomial name
- Penicillium dodgei Pitt, J.I. 1980

Species of fungus

Penicillium dodgei is a species of the genus of Penicillium.

== See also ==
- List of Penicillium species
