= Penicillium diversum =

Scientific classification
- Kingdom: Fungi
- Division: Ascomycota
- Class: Eurotiomycetes
- Order: Eurotiales
- Family: Aspergillaceae
- Genus: Penicillium
- Species: P. diversum

Binomial name
- Penicillium diversum Raper, K.B.; Fennell, D.I. 1948

Type strain
- ATCC 10437, ATU 1294, CBS 320.48, CCRC 31283, CI 946, CMI 40579, DSM 2212, FRR 2121, IAM 7228, ICI 946, IFO 7759, IMI 040579, IMI 040579ii, IMI 040579iii, JCM 22585, MUCL 31189, MUCL 38801, NBRC 7759, NRRL 2121, QM 1921

Synonyms
- Talaromyces diversus

Species of fungus

Penicillium diversum is an anamorph species of the genus of Penicillium which produces austinol, isoaustin and diversonol.

== See also ==
- List of Penicillium species
