= Penicillium flavescens =

Scientific classification
- Kingdom: Fungi
- Division: Ascomycota
- Class: Eurotiomycetes
- Order: Eurotiales
- Family: Aspergillaceae
- Genus: Penicillium
- Species: P. flavescens

Binomial name
- Penicillium flavescens (S. Abe) L. Wang 1956

Type strain
- AS3.15338, CBS 137463, HMAS 244961, NRRL 62805

Synonyms
- Penicillium thomii var. flavescens

Species of fungus

Penicillium flavescens is a species of the genus of Penicillium.

== See also ==
- List of Penicillium species
