= Penicillium alutaceum =

Scientific classification
- Domain: Eukaryota
- Kingdom: Fungi
- Division: Ascomycota
- Class: Eurotiomycetes
- Order: Eurotiales
- Family: Aspergillaceae
- Genus: Penicillium
- Species: P. alutaceum

Binomial name
- Penicillium alutaceum Scott, D.B. 1968

Type strain
- ATCC 18542, CBS 317.67, CSIR 1039, FRR 1158, IFO 31728, IMI 136243, NBRC 31728, NRRL 5812, NRRL A-17113

Synonyms
- Eupenicillium alutaceum (teleomorph)

Species of fungus

Penicillium alutaceum is a fungus species of the genus of Penicillium.

== See also ==
- List of Penicillium species
