= Penicillium chalybeum =

Scientific classification
- Kingdom: Fungi
- Division: Ascomycota
- Class: Eurotiomycetes
- Order: Eurotiales
- Family: Aspergillaceae
- Genus: Penicillium
- Species: P. chalybeum

Binomial name
- Penicillium chalybeum Pitt & A.D. Hocking 1985

Type strain
- ATCC 56974, ATCC 56975, CBS 254.87, CBS 255.87, FRR 2658, FRR 2660, IMI 288721, IMI 288722

Species of fungus

Penicillium chalybeum is a fungus species of the genus of Penicillium which was isolated from dried fish in Sri Lanka discovered in the 1980's.

== See also ==
- List of Penicillium species
