= Penicillium brevistipitatum =

Scientific classification
- Domain: Eukaryota
- Kingdom: Fungi
- Division: Ascomycota
- Class: Eurotiomycetes
- Order: Eurotiales
- Family: Aspergillaceae
- Genus: Penicillium
- Species: P. brevistipitatum

Binomial name
- Penicillium brevistipitatum Wang, L.; Zhuang, W.-Y. 2005

Type strain
- AS3.6887

Species of fungus

Penicillium brevistipitatum is a fungus species of the genus of Penicillium which was isolated from the Jilin Province in China.

== See also ==
- List of Penicillium species
