= Penicillium abidjanum =

Scientific classification
- Kingdom: Fungi
- Division: Ascomycota
- Class: Eurotiomycetes
- Order: Eurotiales
- Family: Aspergillaceae
- Genus: Penicillium
- Species: P. abidjanum

Binomial name
- Penicillium abidjanum Stolk, Antonie van Leeuwenhoek 1968

Type strain
- IMI 136244, FRR 1156, CBS 246.67, ATCC 18385

Synonyms
- Penicillium arvense; Penicillium reticulisporum; Eupenicillium abidjanum (teleomorph); Eupenicillium arvense; Eupenicillium reticulisporum

Species of fungus

Penicillium abidjanum is a fungus species of the genus Penicillium. Its teleomorph is Eupenicillium abidjanum

== See also ==
- List of Penicillium species
