= Penicillium argentinense =

Scientific classification
- Kingdom: Fungi
- Division: Ascomycota
- Class: Eurotiomycetes
- Order: Eurotiales
- Family: Aspergillaceae
- Genus: Penicillium
- Species: P. argentinense

Binomial name
- Penicillium argentinense Houbraken, Frisvad & Samson 2011

Species of fungus

Penicillium argentinense is a fungus species of the genus of Penicillium.

== See also ==
- List of Penicillium species
