= Penicillium coalescens =

Scientific classification
- Domain: Eukaryota
- Kingdom: Fungi
- Division: Ascomycota
- Class: Eurotiomycetes
- Order: Eurotiales
- Family: Aspergillaceae
- Genus: Penicillium
- Species: P. coalescens

Binomial name
- Penicillium coalescens Quintanilla, J.A. 1984

Synonyms
- Talaromyces coalescens

Species of fungus

Penicillium coalescens is a fungus species of the genus of Penicillium which was isolated from soil.

== See also ==
- List of Penicillium species
