= Penicillium calidicanium =

Scientific classification
- Kingdom: Fungi
- Division: Ascomycota
- Class: Eurotiomycetes
- Order: Eurotiales
- Family: Aspergillaceae
- Genus: Penicillium
- Species: P. calidicanium

Binomial name
- Penicillium calidicanium Chen, J.L.; Yen, J.H.; Lin, W.S.; Ku, W.L. 2002

Type strain
- CBS 112002

Synonyms
- Talaromyces calidicanius

Species of fungus

Penicillium calidicanium is a fungus species of the genus of Penicillium which was isolated from soil in Taiwan.

== See also ==
- List of Penicillium species
