= Penicillium bovifimosum =

Scientific classification
- Domain: Eukaryota
- Kingdom: Fungi
- Division: Ascomycota
- Class: Eurotiomycetes
- Order: Eurotiales
- Family: Aspergillaceae
- Genus: Penicillium
- Species: P. bovifimosum

Binomial name
- Penicillium bovifimosum (Tuthill & Frisvad) Houbraken & Samson 2011

Synonyms
- Eupenicillium bovifimosum

Species of fungus

Penicillium bovifimosum is a fungus species of the genus of Penicillium which was isolated from dry cow manure in Wyoming in the United States.

== See also ==
- List of Penicillium species
