= Penicillium albicans =

Scientific classification
- Kingdom: Fungi
- Division: Ascomycota
- Class: Eurotiomycetes
- Order: Eurotiales
- Family: Aspergillaceae
- Genus: Penicillium
- Species: P. albicans

Binomial name
- Penicillium albicans Bainier, G. 1907

Type strain
- CBS 342.52, CBS 342.54, DSM 2206, FRR 0401, FRR 0839, IFO 6771, IMI 063215, LSHB BB288, NBRC 6771, NI 6309, NRRL A-17206, VKM F-442

Species of fungus

Penicillium albicans is a fungus species of the genus of Penicillium.

== See also ==
- List of Penicillium species
