= Penicillium discolor =

Scientific classification
- Kingdom: Fungi
- Division: Ascomycota
- Class: Eurotiomycetes
- Order: Eurotiales
- Family: Aspergillaceae
- Genus: Penicillium
- Species: P. discolor

Binomial name
- Penicillium discolor Frisvad, J.C.; Samson 1997

Type strain
- CBS 474.84, FRR 2933, IBT 14440, IBT 21523, IBT 5738, IMI 285513

Synonyms
- Penicillium echinulatum var. discolor

Species of fungus

Penicillium discolor is a species of the genus of Penicillium which occurs in nuts, vegetables and cheese and produces chaetoglobosins (chaetoglobosin A - J), palitantin, cyclopenin, cyclopenol, cyclopeptin, dehydrocyclopeptin, viridicatin and viridicatol.

== See also ==
- List of Penicillium species
