= Penicillium confertum =

Scientific classification
- Kingdom: Fungi
- Division: Ascomycota
- Class: Eurotiomycetes
- Order: Eurotiales
- Family: Aspergillaceae
- Genus: Penicillium
- Species: P. confertum

Binomial name
- Penicillium confertum (Frisvad, Filtenborg & Wicklow) Frisvad 1990

Type strain
- ATCC 64188, CBS 171.87, FRR 3592, IBT 21515, IBT 3098, IBT 5672, IMI 296930, NRRL 13488, NRRL A-26904]

Synonyms
- Penicillium glandicola var. confertum

Species of fungus

Penicillium confertum is an anamorph fungus species of the genus of Penicillium.

== See also ==
- List of Penicillium species
