= Penicillium fractum =

Scientific classification
- Kingdom: Fungi
- Division: Ascomycota
- Class: Eurotiomycetes
- Order: Eurotiales
- Family: Aspergillaceae
- Genus: Penicillium
- Species: P. fractum

Binomial name
- Penicillium fractum Udagawa, S. 1968

Type strain
- ATCC 18567, CBS 124.68, FRR 3448, IFO 9023, IMI 136701, MUCL 38806, NBRC 9023, NHL 6104, NRRL 3448

Synonyms
- Eupenicillium fractum

Species of fungus

Penicillium fractum is a species of the genus of Penicillium.

== See also ==
- List of Penicillium species
