= Penicillium angulare =

Scientific classification
- Domain: Eukaryota
- Kingdom: Fungi
- Division: Ascomycota
- Class: Eurotiomycetes
- Order: Eurotiales
- Family: Aspergillaceae
- Genus: Penicillium
- Species: P. angulare

Binomial name
- Penicillium angulare S.W. Peterson, E.M. Bayer & Wicklow 2005

Synonyms
- Penicillium angularum

Species of fungus

Penicillium angulare is a fungus species of the genus of Penicillium which was isolated in north America.

== See also ==
- List of Penicillium species
