= Penicillium burgense =

Scientific classification
- Domain: Eukaryota
- Kingdom: Fungi
- Division: Ascomycota
- Class: Eurotiomycetes
- Order: Eurotiales
- Family: Aspergillaceae
- Genus: Penicillium
- Species: P. burgense

Binomial name
- Penicillium burgense Quintanilla 1990

Type strain
- CBS 325.89

Species of fungus

Penicillium burgense is a fungus species of the genus of Penicillium.

== See also ==
- List of Penicillium species
