= Penicillium ellipsoideosporum =

Scientific classification
- Kingdom: Fungi
- Division: Ascomycota
- Class: Eurotiomycetes
- Order: Eurotiales
- Family: Aspergillaceae
- Genus: Penicillium
- Species: P. ellipsoideosporum

Binomial name
- Penicillium ellipsoideosporum Wang, L.; Kong, H.Z. 2000

Type strain
- CGMCC 3.4705

Species of fungus

Penicillium ellipsoideosporum is a species of the genus of Penicillium which was isolated in China.

== See also ==
- List of Penicillium species
