= Penicillium euglaucum =

Scientific classification
- Kingdom: Fungi
- Division: Ascomycota
- Class: Eurotiomycetes
- Order: Eurotiales
- Family: Aspergillaceae
- Genus: Penicillium
- Species: P. euglaucum

Binomial name
- Penicillium euglaucum Beyma, F.H. van. 1940

Type strain
- CBS 323.71

Synonyms
- Eupenicillium euglaucum, Eupenicillium hirayamae, Eupenicillium anatolicum, Eupenicillium katangense, Eupenicillium lassenii

Species of fungus

Penicillium euglaucum is a species of the genus of Penicillium which was isolated from soil in Argentina.

== See also ==
- List of Penicillium species
