= Penicillium brevissimum =

Scientific classification
- Domain: Eukaryota
- Kingdom: Fungi
- Division: Ascomycota
- Class: Eurotiomycetes
- Order: Eurotiales
- Family: Aspergillaceae
- Genus: Penicillium
- Species: P. brevissimum

Binomial name
- Penicillium brevissimum Rai, J.N.; Wachwani, K. 1976

Type strain
- CBS 763.68

Species of fungus

Penicillium brevissimum is a fungus species of the genus of Penicillium which was isolated from Indian soils.

== See also ==
- List of Penicillium species
