= Penicillium dunedinense =

Scientific classification
- Domain: Eukaryota
- Kingdom: Fungi
- Division: Ascomycota
- Class: Eurotiomycetes
- Order: Eurotiales
- Family: Aspergillaceae
- Genus: Penicillium
- Species: P. dunedinense

Binomial name
- Penicillium dunedinense Visagie, Seifert & Samson 2014

Species of fungus

Penicillium dunedinense is a species of the genus of Penicillium which was isolated in Dunedin in New Zealand.

== See also ==
- List of Penicillium species
