= Penicillium angustiporcatum =

Scientific classification
- Domain: Eukaryota
- Kingdom: Fungi
- Division: Ascomycota
- Class: Eurotiomycetes
- Order: Eurotiales
- Family: Aspergillaceae
- Genus: Penicillium
- Species: P. angustiporcatum

Binomial name
- Penicillium angustiporcatum Takada & Udagawa 1983

Type strain
- CBS 202.84, FRR 2591, NHL 6481

Synonyms
- Eupenicillium angustiporcatum (teleomorph)

Species of fungus

Penicillium angustiporcatum is a fungus species of the genus of Penicillium.

== See also ==
- List of Penicillium species
