= Penicillium coccotrypicola =

Scientific classification
- Kingdom: Fungi
- Division: Ascomycota
- Class: Eurotiomycetes
- Order: Eurotiales
- Family: Aspergillaceae
- Genus: Penicillium
- Species: P. coccotrypicola

Binomial name
- Penicillium coccotrypicola Holdom, Y.P. Tan & R.G. Shivas 2014

Species of fungus

Penicillium coccotrypicola is a fungus species of the genus of Penicillium.

== See also ==
- List of Penicillium species
