= Penicillium cinnamopurpureum =

Scientific classification
- Kingdom: Fungi
- Division: Ascomycota
- Class: Eurotiomycetes
- Order: Eurotiales
- Family: Aspergillaceae
- Genus: Penicillium
- Species: P. cinnamopurpureum

Binomial name
- Penicillium cinnamopurpureum Abe ex Udagawa 1959

Type strain
- ATCC 18489, CBS 429.65, CBS 847.68, CCT 4476, CSIR 936, FAT 362, FRR 0162, IAM 7016, IFO 6032, MUCL 40810, NBRC 6032, NHL 6359, NI 6331, NRRL 162, NRRL A-9694, QM 7888

Synonyms
- Eupenicillium cinnamopurpureum

Species of fungus

Penicillium cinnamopurpureum is a fungus species of the genus of Penicillium.

== See also ==
- List of Penicillium species
