= Penicillium alfredii =

Scientific classification
- Domain: Eukaryota
- Kingdom: Fungi
- Division: Ascomycota
- Class: Eurotiomycetes
- Order: Eurotiales
- Family: Aspergillaceae
- Genus: Penicillium
- Species: P. alfredii

Binomial name
- Penicillium alfredii Visagie, K.A. Seifert & R.A. Samson 2014

Type strain
- CBS 138224

Species of fungus

Penicillium alfredii is a fungus species of the genus of Penicillium that is named after Alfred P. Sloan.

== See also ==
- List of Penicillium species
