= Penicillium atrosanguineum =

Scientific classification
- Domain: Eukaryota
- Kingdom: Fungi
- Division: Ascomycota
- Class: Eurotiomycetes
- Order: Eurotiales
- Family: Aspergillaceae
- Genus: Penicillium
- Species: P. atrosanguineum

Binomial name
- Penicillium atrosanguineum Dong, X.B. 1973

Type strain
- CBS 380.75, CCF 1397, CMI 197488, FRR 1726, IAM 13722, IMI 197488, JCM 22780, MUCL 31777, UAMH 5151

Synonyms
- Penicillium manginii, Penicillium pedemontanum

Species of fungus

Penicillium atrosanguineum is a fungus species of the genus of Penicillium.

== See also ==
- List of Penicillium species
