= Penicillium cosmopolitanum =

Scientific classification
- Kingdom: Fungi
- Division: Ascomycota
- Class: Eurotiomycetes
- Order: Eurotiales
- Family: Aspergillaceae
- Genus: Penicillium
- Species: P. cosmopolitanum

Binomial name
- Penicillium cosmopolitanum Houbraken, Frisvad & Samson 2011

Type strain
- CBS 122406, CBS 122435, CBS 124315

Species of fungus

Penicillium cosmopolitanum is a species of the genus of Penicillium which is named after the worldwide occurrence of this species.

== See also ==
- List of Penicillium species
