= Penicillium boreae =

Scientific classification
- Domain: Eukaryota
- Kingdom: Fungi
- Division: Ascomycota
- Class: Eurotiomycetes
- Order: Eurotiales
- Family: Aspergillaceae
- Genus: Penicillium
- Species: P. boreae

Binomial name
- Penicillium boreae S.W. Peterson & Sigler 2002

Species of fungus

Penicillium boreae is a fungus species of the genus Penicillium.

== See also ==
- List of Penicillium species
