= Penicillium infrapurpureum =

Scientific classification
- Domain: Eukaryota
- Kingdom: Fungi
- Division: Ascomycota
- Class: Eurotiomycetes
- Order: Eurotiales
- Family: Aspergillaceae
- Genus: Penicillium
- Species: P. infrapurpureum

Binomial name
- Penicillium infrapurpureum C.M. Visagie, K.A. Seifert & R.A. Samson 2014

Type strain
- CBS 138219, CBS H-21801, DTO 235F6, CMV-2014

Species of fungus

Penicillium infrapurpureum is a species of the genus of Penicillium.
