= Penicillium maclennaniae =

Scientific classification
- Kingdom: Fungi
- Division: Ascomycota
- Class: Eurotiomycetes
- Order: Eurotiales
- Family: Aspergillaceae
- Genus: Penicillium
- Species: P. maclennaniae

Binomial name
- Penicillium maclennaniae Yip, H.J. 1981

Type strain
- ATCC 46743, BCRC 33341, CBS 198.81, CCRC 33341, DAR 35238, IMI 253561

Species of fungus

Penicillium maclennaniae is an anamorph species of fungus in the genus Penicillium.
