= Penicillium vagum =

Scientific classification
- Domain: Eukaryota
- Kingdom: Fungi
- Division: Ascomycota
- Class: Eurotiomycetes
- Order: Eurotiales
- Family: Aspergillaceae
- Genus: Penicillium
- Species: P. vagum

Binomial name
- Penicillium vagum Houbraken, Pitt, Visagie, & K. Jacobs 2014

Type strain
- CBS 137728, CV 25, CV0025, DAOM 241357, DTO 180-G3, CMV-2013l

Species of fungus

Penicillium vagum is a species of fungus in the genus Penicillium which was isolated from an air sample in the Stellenbosch Mountains in Western Cape in South Africa.
