= Penicillium nothofagi =

Scientific classification
- Kingdom: Fungi
- Division: Ascomycota
- Class: Eurotiomycetes
- Order: Eurotiales
- Family: Aspergillaceae
- Genus: Penicillium
- Species: P. nothofagi

Binomial name
- Penicillium nothofagi Houbraken, Frisvad & Samson 2011

Type strain
- CBS 130383, CBS 127004, CBS 130383, DTO 76C2

Species of fungus

Penicillium nothofagi is a species of fungus in the genus Penicillium.
