= Penicillium subtile =

Scientific classification
- Domain: Eukaryota
- Kingdom: Fungi
- Division: Ascomycota
- Class: Eurotiomycetes
- Order: Eurotiales
- Family: Aspergillaceae
- Genus: Penicillium
- Species: P. subtile

Binomial name
- Penicillium subtile Berkeley, M.J. 1841

Species of fungus

Penicillium subtile is a species of fungus in the genus Penicillium.
