= Penicillium neocrassum =

Scientific classification
- Domain: Eukaryota
- Kingdom: Fungi
- Division: Ascomycota
- Class: Eurotiomycetes
- Order: Eurotiales
- Family: Aspergillaceae
- Genus: Penicillium
- Species: P. neocrassum

Binomial name
- Penicillium neocrassum Serra, R.; Peterson, S.W. 2007

Type strain
- BPI 872161, NRRL 35639

Species of fungus

Penicillium neocrassum is a terverticillate species of fungus in the genus Penicillium which was isolated from grapes.
