= Penicillium pulvis =

Scientific classification
- Kingdom: Fungi
- Division: Ascomycota
- Class: Eurotiomycetes
- Order: Eurotiales
- Family: Aspergillaceae
- Genus: Penicillium
- Species: P. pulvis

Binomial name
- Penicillium pulvis Houbraken, Visagie, Samson & Seifert 2014

Type strain
- CBS 138432, DTO 180-B7

Species of fungus

Penicillium pulvis is a species of fungus in the genus Penicillium which was isolated from house dust in Kuils River, South Africa.
