= Penicillium mexicanum =

Scientific classification
- Domain: Eukaryota
- Kingdom: Fungi
- Division: Ascomycota
- Class: Eurotiomycetes
- Order: Eurotiales
- Family: Aspergillaceae
- Genus: Penicillium
- Species: P. mexicanum

Binomial name
- Penicillium mexicanum Visagie, Seifert & Samson 2014

Type strain
- CBS 138227, CBS H-21805, DTO 270F1

Species of fungus

Penicillium mexicanum is a species of the genus Penicillium.
