= Penicillium virgatum =

Scientific classification
- Kingdom: Fungi
- Division: Ascomycota
- Class: Eurotiomycetes
- Order: Eurotiales
- Family: Aspergillaceae
- Genus: Penicillium
- Species: P. virgatum

Binomial name
- Penicillium virgatum Kwasna, H.; Nirenberg, H.I. 2005

Type strain
- BBA 65745, CBS 114838, IMI 391742

Species of fungus

Penicillium vinaceum is a species of fungus in the genus Penicillium which was isolated from soil of a soybean field in New Caledonia.
