= Penicillium pullum =

Scientific classification
- Domain: Eukaryota
- Kingdom: Fungi
- Division: Ascomycota
- Class: Eurotiomycetes
- Order: Eurotiales
- Family: Aspergillaceae
- Genus: Penicillium
- Species: P. pullum

Binomial name
- Penicillium pullum Peterson, S.W.; Sigler, L. 2002

Species of fungus

Penicillium pullum is a species of fungus in the genus Penicillium.
