= Penicillium magnielliptisporum =

Scientific classification
- Domain: Eukaryota
- Kingdom: Fungi
- Division: Ascomycota
- Class: Eurotiomycetes
- Order: Eurotiales
- Family: Aspergillaceae
- Genus: Penicillium
- Species: P. magnielliptisporum

Binomial name
- Penicillium magnielliptisporum C.M. Visagie, K.A. Seifert & R.A. Samson 2014

Type strain
- CBS 138225, CBS H-21806, DTO 128H8

Species of fungus

Penicillium magnielliptisporum is a species of the genus of Penicillium.
