= Penicillium pinsaporum =

Scientific classification
- Domain: Eukaryota
- Kingdom: Fungi
- Division: Ascomycota
- Class: Eurotiomycetes
- Order: Eurotiales
- Family: Aspergillaceae
- Genus: Penicillium
- Species: P. pinsaporum

Binomial name
- Penicillium pinsaporum C. Ramírez & A.T. Martínez

Species of fungus

Penicillium pinsaporum is a species of fungus in the genus Penicillium.
