= Penicillium vinaceum =

Scientific classification
- Kingdom: Fungi
- Division: Ascomycota
- Class: Eurotiomycetes
- Order: Eurotiales
- Family: Aspergillaceae
- Genus: Penicillium
- Species: P. vinaceum

Binomial name
- Penicillium vinaceum Gilman, J.C.; Abbott, E.V. 1927

Type strain
- ATCC 10514, CBS 389.48, CMI 29189, FAT 1291, FRR 0739, FRR 0946, IAM 7143, IFO 5794, IMI 029189, IMI 190571, JCM 22565, KCTC 6259, KP 166, KY 830, MUCL 38767, NBRC 5794, NRRL 739, QM 6746, Thom 4894.15, WB 739

Species of fungus

Penicillium vinaceum is an anamorph species of fungus in the genus Penicillium which produces penicillivinacine, vinaxanthone and citromycetin.
