= Penicillium parmonense =

Scientific classification
- Domain: Eukaryota
- Kingdom: Fungi
- Division: Ascomycota
- Class: Eurotiomycetes
- Order: Eurotiales
- Family: Aspergillaceae
- Genus: Penicillium
- Species: P. parmonense

Binomial name
- Penicillium parmonense Baghdadi 1964

Type strain
- IMI 140340

Species of fungus

Penicillium parmonense is a species of the genus of Penicillium.
