= Penicillium tarraconense =

Scientific classification
- Domain: Eukaryota
- Kingdom: Fungi
- Division: Ascomycota
- Class: Eurotiomycetes
- Order: Eurotiales
- Family: Aspergillaceae
- Genus: Penicillium
- Species: P. tarraconense

Binomial name
- Penicillium tarraconense Ramírez, C.; Martínez, A.T. 1980

Species of fungus

Penicillium tarraconense is an anamorph species of fungus in the genus Penicillium which was isolated from air in Madrid in Spain.
