= Penicillium kloeckeri =

Scientific classification
- Domain: Eukaryota
- Kingdom: Fungi
- Division: Ascomycota
- Class: Eurotiomycetes
- Order: Eurotiales
- Family: Aspergillaceae
- Genus: Penicillium
- Species: P. kloeckeri

Binomial name
- Penicillium kloeckeri Pitt, J.I. 1979

Species of fungus

Penicillium kloeckeri is an anamorph species of the genus of Penicillium.
