= Penicillium gracilentum =

Scientific classification
- Domain: Eukaryota
- Kingdom: Fungi
- Division: Ascomycota
- Class: Eurotiomycetes
- Order: Eurotiales
- Family: Aspergillaceae
- Genus: Penicillium
- Species: P. gracilentum

Binomial name
- Penicillium gracilentum Udagawa, S.I.; Horie, Y. 1973

Synonyms
- Eupenicillium gracilentum

Species of fungus

Penicillium gracilentum is a species of the genus of Penicillium.
