= Penicillium pancosmium =

Scientific classification
- Kingdom: Fungi
- Division: Ascomycota
- Class: Eurotiomycetes
- Order: Eurotiales
- Family: Aspergillaceae
- Genus: Penicillium
- Species: P. pancosmium

Binomial name
- Penicillium pancosmium Houbraken, Frisvad & Samson 2011

Type strain
- CBS 276.75

Synonyms
- Penicillium pancosium

Species of fungus

Penicillium pancosmium is a species of fungus in the genus Penicillium.
