= Penicillium heteromorphum =

Scientific classification
- Kingdom: Fungi
- Division: Ascomycota
- Class: Eurotiomycetes
- Order: Eurotiales
- Family: Aspergillaceae
- Genus: Penicillium
- Species: P. heteromorphum

Binomial name
- Penicillium heteromorphum Kong, H.Z.; Qi, Z.T. 1988

Type strain
- CBS 226.89

Species of fungus

Penicillium heteromorphum is a species of the genus of Penicillium.
