= Penicillium ianthinellum =

Scientific classification
- Kingdom: Fungi
- Division: Ascomycota
- Class: Eurotiomycetes
- Order: Eurotiales
- Family: Aspergillaceae
- Genus: Penicillium
- Species: P. ianthinellum

Binomial name
- Penicillium ianthinellum Biourge, P. 1923

Species of fungus

Penicillium ianthinellum is a species of the genus of Penicillium.
