= Penicillium kiamaense =

Scientific classification
- Domain: Eukaryota
- Kingdom: Fungi
- Division: Ascomycota
- Class: Eurotiomycetes
- Order: Eurotiales
- Family: Aspergillaceae
- Genus: Penicillium
- Species: P. kiamaense

Binomial name
- Penicillium kiamaense Houbraken & Pitt 2014

Type strain
- CBS 137947, DTO 056-I6, FRR 6087

Species of fungus

Penicillium kiamaense is a species of the genus of Penicillium.
