= Penicillium indonesiae =

Scientific classification
- Domain: Eukaryota
- Kingdom: Fungi
- Division: Ascomycota
- Class: Eurotiomycetes
- Order: Eurotiales
- Family: Aspergillaceae
- Genus: Penicillium
- Species: P. indonesiae

Binomial name
- Penicillium indonesiae Pitt, J.I. 1980

Type strain
- ATCC 9099, Biourge 107, CBS 341.48, CSIR 831, FRR 0707, IFO 31735, IMI 039733, MUCL 29099, MUCL 38760, NBIMCC 1868, NBRC 31735, NRRL 707, QM 1876, Thom 5117

Species of fungus

Penicillium indonesiae is a species of the genus of Penicillium.
