= Penicillium vanbeymae =

Scientific classification
- Kingdom: Fungi
- Division: Ascomycota
- Class: Eurotiomycetes
- Order: Eurotiales
- Family: Aspergillaceae
- Genus: Penicillium
- Species: P. vanbeymae

Binomial name
- Penicillium vanbeymae Pitt, J.I. 1979

Type strain
- ATCC 10415, CBS 134.41, CSIR 729, FRR 2086, FRR 3329, IFO 6090, IFO 8846, IMI 040590, IMI 040950, MUCL 38797, NBRC 6090, NBRC 8846, NRRL 2086, NRRL 3329, QM 1871

Species of fungus

Penicillium vanbeymae is an anamorph species of fungus in the genus Penicillium. It is described as blue to yellow mold.
