= Penicillium panamense =

Scientific classification
- Kingdom: Fungi
- Division: Ascomycota
- Class: Eurotiomycetes
- Order: Eurotiales
- Family: Aspergillaceae
- Genus: Penicillium
- Species: P. panamense

Binomial name
- Penicillium panamense Samson, R.A.; Stolk, A.C.; Frisvad, J.C. 1989

Type strain
- CBS 128.89, IMI 297546

Synonyms
- Talaromyces panamensis

Species of fungus

Penicillium panamense is a species of fungus in the genus Penicillium which produces vermicellin.
