= Penicillium vanluykii =

Scientific classification
- Kingdom: Fungi
- Division: Ascomycota
- Class: Eurotiomycetes
- Order: Eurotiales
- Family: Aspergillaceae
- Genus: Penicillium
- Species: P. vanluykii

Binomial name
- Penicillium vanluykii Frisvad, Houbraken & Samson 2012

Type strain
- CBS 131539, JH-2013d

Species of fungus

Penicillium vanluykii is a species of fungus in the genus Penicillium which produces penicillin.
