= Penicillium ubiquetum =

Scientific classification
- Domain: Eukaryota
- Kingdom: Fungi
- Division: Ascomycota
- Class: Eurotiomycetes
- Order: Eurotiales
- Family: Aspergillaceae
- Genus: Penicillium
- Species: P. ubiquetum

Binomial name
- Penicillium ubiquetum Houbraken, Frisvad & Samson 2011

Type strain
- CBS 126437, DTO 78B5, IBT 22226, CBS 117212, CBS 124317

Species of fungus

Penicillium ubiquetum is a species of fungus in the genus Penicillium.
