= Penicillium sublectaticum =

Scientific classification
- Domain: Eukaryota
- Kingdom: Fungi
- Division: Ascomycota
- Class: Eurotiomycetes
- Order: Eurotiales
- Family: Aspergillaceae
- Genus: Penicillium
- Species: P. sublectaticum

Binomial name
- Penicillium sublectaticum Houbraken, Frisvad, Samson & Seifert 2014

Type strain
- CBS 138217, DTO 244-G2

Synonyms
- Penicillium sublectatum

Species of fungus

Penicillium sublectaticum is a species of fungus in the genus Penicillium which was isolated from house dust in Dunedin in New Zealand.
