= Penicillium patens =

Scientific classification
- Kingdom: Fungi
- Division: Ascomycota
- Class: Eurotiomycetes
- Order: Eurotiales
- Family: Aspergillaceae
- Genus: Penicillium
- Species: P. patens

Binomial name
- Penicillium patens Pitt, J.I.; Hocking, A.D. 1985

Type strain
- ATCC 56980, CBS 260.87, FRR 2661, FRR 2662, IMI 288723

Species of fungus

Penicillium patens is an anamorph species of the genus of Penicillium.
