= Penicillium subericola =

Scientific classification
- Kingdom: Fungi
- Division: Ascomycota
- Class: Eurotiomycetes
- Order: Eurotiales
- Family: Aspergillaceae
- Genus: Penicillium
- Species: P. subericola

Binomial name
- Penicillium subericola Barreto, Frisvad & Samson 2010

Species of fungus

Penicillium subericola is a fast growing species of fungus in the genus Penicillium which was isolated from raw cork.
