= Penicillium lassenii =

Scientific classification
- Domain: Eukaryota
- Kingdom: Fungi
- Division: Ascomycota
- Class: Eurotiomycetes
- Order: Eurotiales
- Family: Aspergillaceae
- Genus: Penicillium
- Species: P. lassenii

Binomial name
- Penicillium lassenii Paden, J.W. 1971

Type strain
- ATCC 22054, CBS 277.70, FRR 858, IFO 31736, IMI 148395, NRRL 5272

Species of fungus

Penicillium lassenii is an anamorph species of the genus of Penicillium.
