= Penicillium griseopurpureum =

Scientific classification
- Domain: Eukaryota
- Kingdom: Fungi
- Division: Ascomycota
- Class: Eurotiomycetes
- Order: Eurotiales
- Family: Aspergillaceae
- Genus: Penicillium
- Species: P. griseopurpureum

Binomial name
- Penicillium griseopurpureum Smith, G. 1965

Species of fungus

Penicillium griseopurpureum is a species of the genus of Penicillium.
