= Penicillium murcianum =

Scientific classification
- Kingdom: Fungi
- Division: Ascomycota
- Class: Eurotiomycetes
- Order: Eurotiales
- Family: Aspergillaceae
- Genus: Penicillium
- Species: P. murcianum

Binomial name
- Penicillium murcianum Ramírez, C.; Martínez, A.T. 1981

Type strain
- ATCC 42239, CBS 161.81, IJFM 7031, IMI 253800, VKM F-2196

Species of fungus

Penicillium murcianum is an anamorph species of the genus Penicillium.
