= Penicillium hirayamae =

Scientific classification
- Kingdom: Fungi
- Division: Ascomycota
- Class: Eurotiomycetes
- Order: Eurotiales
- Family: Aspergillaceae
- Genus: Penicillium
- Species: P. hirayamae

Binomial name
- Penicillium hirayamae Udagawa, S. 1959

Type strain
- ATCC 18312, BCRC 31559, CBS 229.60, CCRC 31559, CCT 4465, CGMCC 3.4396, FRR 0143, FRR 3331, IAM 13727, ICI 1397, IFO 6435, IMI 000078.255, IMI 078255, IMI 078255ii, IMI 078255iiP, JCM 22785, MUCL 31208, NBIMCC 2003, NBRC 6435, NHL 6046, NI 6323, NRRL 143, NRRL 3331, NRRL A-9693, QM 7885

Synonyms
- Eupenicillium hirayamae, Eupenicillium hirayame

Species of fungus

Penicillium hirayamae is an anamorph species of the genus of Penicillium which produces rubrorotiorin.
