= Penicillium rudallense =

Scientific classification
- Domain: Eukaryota
- Kingdom: Fungi
- Division: Ascomycota
- Class: Eurotiomycetes
- Order: Eurotiales
- Family: Aspergillaceae
- Genus: Penicillium
- Species: P. rudallense

Binomial name
- Penicillium rudallense Houbraken, Visagie & Pitt 2014

Type strain
- CBS 138162, DTO 056-I4, FRR 6085

Species of fungus

Penicillium rudallense is a species of fungus in the genus Penicillium isolated from the Karlamilyi National Park in Western Australia.
