= Penicillium salamii =

Scientific classification
- Domain: Eukaryota
- Kingdom: Fungi
- Division: Ascomycota
- Class: Eurotiomycetes
- Order: Eurotiales
- Family: Aspergillaceae
- Genus: Penicillium
- Species: P. salamii

Binomial name
- Penicillium salamii G. Perrone, Frisvad, Samson & Houbraken

Species of fungus

Penicillium salamii is a species of fungus in the genus Penicillium which occurs on dry-cured meat products.
