= Penicillium restingae =

Scientific classification
- Kingdom: Fungi
- Division: Ascomycota
- Class: Eurotiomycetes
- Order: Eurotiales
- Family: Aspergillaceae
- Genus: Penicillium
- Species: P. restingae

Binomial name
- Penicillium restingae J.P. Andrade, P.A.S. Marbach, C.M.S. Mota & J.T De Souza 2014

Species of fungus

Penicillium restingae is a species of fungus in the genus Penicillium which was isolated from soil of the Guaibim sandbank in Bahia in Brazil.
