= Penicillium ranomafanaense =

Scientific classification
- Domain: Eukaryota
- Kingdom: Fungi
- Division: Ascomycota
- Class: Eurotiomycetes
- Order: Eurotiales
- Family: Aspergillaceae
- Genus: Penicillium
- Species: P. ranomafanaense

Binomial name
- Penicillium ranomafanaense Houbraken & Hagen 2014

Species of fungus

Penicillium ranomafanaense is a species of fungus in the genus Penicillium which isolated from soil in Ranomafana in Madagascar.
