= Penicillium qii =

Scientific classification
- Kingdom: Fungi
- Division: Ascomycota
- Class: Eurotiomycetes
- Order: Eurotiales
- Family: Aspergillaceae
- Genus: Penicillium
- Species: P. qii

Binomial name
- Penicillium qii Wang, B. and Wang, L

Type strain
- AS3.15343

Species of fungus

Penicillium qii is a species of the genus of Penicillium which was isolated from plant leaves in China.
