= Penicillium sphaerum =

Scientific classification
- Kingdom: Fungi
- Division: Ascomycota
- Class: Eurotiomycetes
- Order: Eurotiales
- Family: Aspergillaceae
- Genus: Penicillium
- Species: P. sphaerum

Binomial name
- Penicillium sphaerum Pitt, J.I. 1980

Type strain
- ATCC 10493, CBS 369.48, FRR 2107, IFO 31756, IMI 040589, MUCL 38800, NBRC 31756, NRRL 2107, QM 1854

Species of fungus

Penicillium sphaerum is a species of fungus in the genus Penicillium which was isolated from wood in Panama.
