= Penicillium molle =

Scientific classification
- Domain: Eukaryota
- Kingdom: Fungi
- Division: Ascomycota
- Class: Eurotiomycetes
- Order: Eurotiales
- Family: Aspergillaceae
- Genus: Penicillium
- Species: P. molle

Binomial name
- Penicillium molle Pitt, J.I. 1980

Type strain
- ATCC 24075, CBS 456.72, FRR 1542, IFO 31738, IMI 084589, TRTC 45714

Synonyms
- Eupenicillium molle

Species of fungus

Penicillium molle is an anamorph species of the genus Penicillium.
