= Penicillium lignorum =

Scientific classification
- Kingdom: Fungi
- Division: Ascomycota
- Class: Eurotiomycetes
- Order: Eurotiales
- Family: Aspergillaceae
- Genus: Penicillium
- Species: P. lignorum

Binomial name
- Penicillium lignorum Stolk, A.C. 1969

Type strain
- ATCC 22051, CBS 709.68, FRR 0804, IMI 151899, NCIM 1150, UPSC 3184

Species of fungus

Penicillium lignorum is an anamorph species of the genus of Penicillium.
