= Penicillium stolkiae =

Scientific classification
- Kingdom: Fungi
- Division: Ascomycota
- Class: Eurotiomycetes
- Order: Eurotiales
- Family: Aspergillaceae
- Genus: Penicillium
- Species: P. stolkiae

Binomial name
- Penicillium stolkiae Scott, D.B. 1968

Type strain
- ATCC 18546, CBS 315.67, CSIR 1041, FRR 0534, IFO 9157, IMI 136210, NBRC 9157, NRRL 5816, NRRL A

Synonyms
- Eupenicillium stolkiae

Species of fungus

Penicillium stolkiae is a species of fungus in the genus Penicillium.
