= Penicillium humuli =

Scientific classification
- Domain: Eukaryota
- Kingdom: Fungi
- Division: Ascomycota
- Class: Eurotiomycetes
- Order: Eurotiales
- Family: Aspergillaceae
- Genus: Penicillium
- Species: P. humuli

Binomial name
- Penicillium humuli Beyma, F.H. van. 1939

Type strain
- ATCC 10452, CBS 231.38, FRR 0872, IFO 7726, IMI 039817, MUCL 38772, NBRC 7726, NRRL 872, Thom 5633.3

Species of fungus

Penicillium humuli is an anamorph species of the genus of Penicillium.
