= Penicillium nodulum =

Scientific classification
- Domain: Eukaryota
- Kingdom: Fungi
- Division: Ascomycota
- Class: Eurotiomycetes
- Order: Eurotiales
- Family: Aspergillaceae
- Genus: Penicillium
- Species: P. nodulum

Binomial name
- Penicillium nodulum Kong, H.Z.; Qi, Z.T. 1988

Species of fungus

Penicillium nodulum is a species of fungus in the genus Penicillium.
