= Penicillium macrosclerotiorum =

Scientific classification
- Domain: Eukaryota
- Kingdom: Fungi
- Division: Ascomycota
- Class: Eurotiomycetes
- Order: Eurotiales
- Family: Aspergillaceae
- Genus: Penicillium
- Species: P. macrosclerotiorum

Binomial name
- Penicillium macrosclerotiorum L. Wang, X.-M. Zhang & W.Y. Zhuang 2007

Species of fungus

Penicillium macrosclerotiorum is a species of the genus Penicillium, which was isolated from soil in south China.
