= Penicillium parvulum =

Scientific classification
- Domain: Eukaryota
- Kingdom: Fungi
- Division: Ascomycota
- Class: Eurotiomycetes
- Order: Eurotiales
- Family: Aspergillaceae
- Genus: Penicillium
- Species: P. parvulum

Binomial name
- Penicillium parvulum Peterson, S.W.; Horn, B.W. 2009

Species of fungus

Penicillium parvulum is a monoverticillate species of fungus in the genus Penicillium which was isolated from soil of a peanut field in Georgia.
