= Penicillium onobense =

Scientific classification
- Kingdom: Fungi
- Division: Ascomycota
- Class: Eurotiomycetes
- Order: Eurotiales
- Family: Aspergillaceae
- Genus: Penicillium
- Species: P. onobense

Binomial name
- Penicillium onobense Ramírez, C.; Martínez, A.T. 1981

Type strain
- ATCC 42225, CBS 174.81, IJFM 3026, IMI 253787, VKM F-2183

Species of fungus

Penicillium onobense is an anamorph species in the genus Penicillium which was isolated from beech forest in Navarra in Spain.
