= Penicillium rubidurum =

Scientific classification
- Domain: Eukaryota
- Kingdom: Fungi
- Division: Ascomycota
- Class: Eurotiomycetes
- Order: Eurotiales
- Family: Aspergillaceae
- Genus: Penicillium
- Species: P. rubidurum

Binomial name
- Penicillium rubidurum Udagawa, S.I.; Horie, Y. 1973

Type strain
- ATCC 28051, ATCC 48238, CBS 609.73, FRR 1558, IFO 9703, IMI 228551, MUCL 38966, NBRC 9703, NHL 6460, NRRL 6033

Synonyms
- Eupenicillium rubidurum

Species of fungus

Penicillium rubidurum is an anamorph, monoverticillate species of fungus in the genus Penicillium.
