= Penicillium turbatum =

Scientific classification
- Kingdom: Fungi
- Division: Ascomycota
- Class: Eurotiomycetes
- Order: Eurotiales
- Family: Aspergillaceae
- Genus: Penicillium
- Species: P. turbatum

Binomial name
- Penicillium turbatum Westling, R. 1911

Type strain
- ATCC 16442, ATCC 34961, ATCC 9782, BCRC 33086, Biourge 104, Biourge 378, CBS 237.60, CBS 383.48, CBS 531.65, CCRC 33086, CCT 3113, CMI 39738, DSM 2426, FRR 0757, IAM 14086, IFO 7767, IMI 039738, IMI 211381, JCM 10454, KCTC 6262, MUCL 29115, NBRC 7767, NRRL 75, NRRL 757, NRRL 758, QM 19, QM 1941, Thom 2545, Thom 4733.122, Thom 5629.E, WB 75

Species of fungus

Penicillium turbatum is an anamorph species of fungus in the genus Penicillium which was isolated from Taxus baccata. Penicillium turbatum produces pipolythiopiperazinedione-antibiotics, hyalodendrin A and hadacitin.
