= Penicillium guanacastense =

Scientific classification
- Domain: Eukaryota
- Kingdom: Fungi
- Division: Ascomycota
- Class: Eurotiomycetes
- Order: Eurotiales
- Family: Aspergillaceae
- Genus: Penicillium
- Species: P. guanacastense

Binomial name
- Penicillium guanacastense Rivera, Urb & Seifert 2012

Species of fungus

Penicillium guanacastense is a species of the genus of Penicillium which was isolated from caterpillars from Costa Rica.
