= Penicillium johnkrugii =

Scientific classification
- Kingdom: Fungi
- Division: Ascomycota
- Class: Eurotiomycetes
- Order: Eurotiales
- Family: Aspergillaceae
- Genus: Penicillium
- Species: P. johnkrugii

Binomial name
- Penicillium johnkrugii Rivera, K.G.; Seifert, K.A. 2011

Type strain
- DAOM 239943

Synonyms
- Penicillium krugii

Species of fungus

Penicillium johnkrugii is a species of the genus of Penicillium.
