= Penicillium longicatenatum =

Scientific classification
- Kingdom: Fungi
- Division: Ascomycota
- Class: Eurotiomycetes
- Order: Eurotiales
- Family: Aspergillaceae
- Genus: Penicillium
- Species: P. longicatenatum

Binomial name
- Penicillium longicatenatum Visagie, Busby, Houbraken & K. Jacobs 2014

Type strain
- CBS 137735, CV 2847, DAOM 241119, DTO 180-D9

Species of fungus

Penicillium longicatenatum is a species of the genus of Penicillium which was isolated from soil in South Africa.
