= Penicillium miczynskii =

Scientific classification
- Domain: Eukaryota
- Kingdom: Fungi
- Division: Ascomycota
- Class: Eurotiomycetes
- Order: Eurotiales
- Family: Aspergillaceae
- Genus: Penicillium
- Species: P. miczynskii

Binomial name
- Penicillium miczynskii Zalessky, K.M. 1927

Type strain
- 5010.5, ATCC 10470, Biourge 295, CBS 220.28, CGMCC 3.4475, DSM 2437, FRR 1077, IFM 47734, IFO 7730, IMI 040030, KCTC 6406, MUCL 29228, NBRC 7730, NRRL 1077, QM 1957

Synonyms
- Penicillium sulfureum

Species of fungus

Penicillium miczynskii is a species of the genus Penicillium which was isolated from soil under conifers in Poland. Penicillium miczynskii produces citreoviridin.
