= Penicillium simile =

Scientific classification
- Domain: Eukaryota
- Kingdom: Fungi
- Division: Ascomycota
- Class: Eurotiomycetes
- Order: Eurotiales
- Family: Aspergillaceae
- Genus: Penicillium
- Species: P. simile

Binomial name
- Penicillium simile Persiani and Maggi 2011

Type strain
- ATCC MYA-4591, CBS 129191

Species of fungus

Penicillium simile is a species of fungus in the genus Penicillium.
