= Penicillium nepalense =

Scientific classification
- Domain: Eukaryota
- Kingdom: Fungi
- Division: Ascomycota
- Class: Eurotiomycetes
- Order: Eurotiales
- Family: Aspergillaceae
- Genus: Penicillium
- Species: P. nepalense

Binomial name
- Penicillium nepalense Takada, M.; Udagawa, S.-I. 1983

Type strain
- CBS 203.84, NHL 6482

Synonyms
- Eupenicillium nepalense

Species of fungus

Penicillium nepalense is a species of fungus in the genus Penicillium.
