= Penicillium glaucoalbidum =

Scientific classification
- Kingdom: Fungi
- Division: Ascomycota
- Class: Eurotiomycetes
- Order: Eurotiales
- Family: Aspergillaceae
- Genus: Penicillium
- Species: P. glaucoalbidum

Binomial name
- Penicillium glaucoalbidum Houbraken, J.; Samson, R.A. 2011

Synonyms
- Sclerotium glaucoalbidum, Thysanophora glaucoalbida

Species of fungus

Penicillium glaucoalbidum is a species of the genus of Penicillium.
