= Penicillium singorense =

Scientific classification
- Domain: Eukaryota
- Kingdom: Fungi
- Division: Ascomycota
- Class: Eurotiomycetes
- Order: Eurotiales
- Family: Aspergillaceae
- Genus: Penicillium
- Species: P. singorense

Binomial name
- Penicillium singorense C.M. Visagie, K.A. Seifert & R.A. Samson 2014

Type strain
- CBS 138214, DTO 133C6

Species of fungus

Penicillium singorense is a species of fungus in the genus Penicillium which was isolated from house dust in the city Songkhla in Thailand.
