= Penicillium sterculiniicola =

Scientific classification
- Domain: Eukaryota
- Kingdom: Fungi
- Division: Ascomycota
- Class: Eurotiomycetes
- Order: Eurotiales
- Family: Aspergillaceae
- Genus: Penicillium
- Species: P. sterculiniicola

Binomial name
- Penicillium sterculiniicola Houbraken 2014

Type strain
- CBS 122426, DTO 031-A4

Species of fungus

Penicillium sterculiniicola is a species of fungus in the genus Penicillium which was isolated from spawn run compost in the United States.
