= Penicillium skrjabinii =

Scientific classification
- Kingdom: Fungi
- Division: Ascomycota
- Class: Eurotiomycetes
- Order: Eurotiales
- Family: Aspergillaceae
- Genus: Penicillium
- Species: P. skrjabinii

Binomial name
- Penicillium skrjabinii Schmotina & Golovleva 1974

Type strain
- ATCC 48705, CBS 439.75, FRR 1945, IMI 196528, VKM F-1940

Species of fungus

Penicillium skrjabinii is a species of fungus in the genus Penicillium which was isolated from soil near Blagoveshchensk in Amur Oblast in Siberia.
