= Penicillium incoloratum =

Scientific classification
- Kingdom: Fungi
- Division: Ascomycota
- Class: Eurotiomycetes
- Order: Eurotiales
- Family: Aspergillaceae
- Genus: Penicillium
- Species: P. incoloratum

Binomial name
- Penicillium incoloratum L.Q. Huang & Z.T. Qi 1994

Type strain
- AS 3.4672, CBS 101753, CGMCC 3.4672

Species of fungus

Penicillium incoloratum is a species of the genus of Penicillium.
