= Penicillium philippinense =

Scientific classification
- Domain: Eukaryota
- Kingdom: Fungi
- Division: Ascomycota
- Class: Eurotiomycetes
- Order: Eurotiales
- Family: Aspergillaceae
- Genus: Penicillium
- Species: P. philippinense

Binomial name
- Penicillium philippinense Udagawa & Y. Horie 1972

Species of fungus

Penicillium philippinense is a species of fungus in the genus Penicillium.
