= Penicillium hennebertii =

Scientific classification
- Domain: Eukaryota
- Kingdom: Fungi
- Division: Ascomycota
- Class: Eurotiomycetes
- Order: Eurotiales
- Family: Aspergillaceae
- Genus: Penicillium
- Species: P. hennebertii

Binomial name
- Penicillium hennebertii Houbraken, J.; Samson, R.A. 2011

Synonyms
- Thysanophora canadensis

Species of fungus

Penicillium hennebertii is a species of the genus of Penicillium.
