= Penicillium laeve =

Scientific classification
- Domain: Eukaryota
- Kingdom: Fungi
- Division: Ascomycota
- Class: Eurotiomycetes
- Order: Eurotiales
- Family: Aspergillaceae
- Genus: Penicillium
- Species: P. laeve

Binomial name
- Penicillium laeve Houbraken, J.; Samson, R.A. 2011

Synonyms
- Torulomyces laevis

Species of fungus

Penicillium laeve is a species of the genus of Penicillium.
