= Penicillium vanderhammenii =

Scientific classification
- Kingdom: Fungi
- Division: Ascomycota
- Class: Eurotiomycetes
- Order: Eurotiales
- Family: Aspergillaceae
- Genus: Penicillium
- Species: P. vanderhammenii

Binomial name
- Penicillium vanderhammenii Houbraken, C. López, Frisvad & Samson 2011

Species of fungus

Penicillium vanderhammenii is a species of fungus in the genus Penicillium which was isolated from the Colombian Amazon forest.
