= Penicillium kananaskense =

Scientific classification
- Kingdom: Fungi
- Division: Ascomycota
- Class: Eurotiomycetes
- Order: Eurotiales
- Family: Aspergillaceae
- Genus: Penicillium
- Species: P. kananaskense

Binomial name
- Penicillium kananaskense Seifert, Frisvad & McLean 1994

Type strain
- ATCC 90282, CBS 530.93, DAOM 216105, IBT 11775, IMI 356791, UAMH 7437

Species of fungus

Penicillium kananaskense is an anamorph species of the genus of Penicillium which was isolated from soil of a forest in Alberta in Canada.
