= Penicillium subarcticum =

Scientific classification
- Kingdom: Fungi
- Division: Ascomycota
- Class: Eurotiomycetes
- Order: Eurotiales
- Family: Aspergillaceae
- Genus: Penicillium
- Species: P. subarcticum

Binomial name
- Penicillium subarcticum Peterson, S.W.; Sigler, L. 2002

Type strain
- BPI 841397, NRRL 31108, UAMH 3897

Species of fungus

Penicillium subarcticum is a species of fungus in the genus Penicillium.
