= Penicillium sinaicum =

Scientific classification
- Kingdom: Fungi
- Division: Ascomycota
- Class: Eurotiomycetes
- Order: Eurotiales
- Family: Aspergillaceae
- Genus: Penicillium
- Species: P. sinaicum

Binomial name
- Penicillium sinaicum Udagawa, S.; Ueda, S. 1982

Type strain
- ATCC 46604, CBS 279.82, NHL 2894

Synonyms
- Eupenicillium sinaicum

Species of fungus

Penicillium sinaicum is a species of fungus in the genus Penicillium which was isolated from marine sludge near Port Said City in Sinai Peninsula in Egypt.
