= Penicillium intermedium =

Scientific classification
- Domain: Eukaryota
- Kingdom: Fungi
- Division: Ascomycota
- Class: Eurotiomycetes
- Order: Eurotiales
- Family: Aspergillaceae
- Genus: Penicillium
- Species: P. intermedium

Binomial name
- Penicillium intermedium Stolk, A.C.; Samson, R.A. 1972

Type strain
- IMI 191398

Species of fungus

Penicillium intermedium is a species of the genus of Penicillium.
