= Penicillium malmesburiense =

Scientific classification
- Domain: Eukaryota
- Kingdom: Fungi
- Division: Ascomycota
- Class: Eurotiomycetes
- Order: Eurotiales
- Family: Aspergillaceae
- Genus: Penicillium
- Species: P. malmesburiense

Binomial name
- Penicillium malmesburiense Visagie, Houbraken & K. Jacobs 2014

Type strain
- CBS 137744, CV 1180, DAOM 241144, DTO 182-H5

Species of fungus

Penicillium malmesburiense is a species of the genus of Penicillium.
