= Penicillium infra-aurantiacum =

Scientific classification
- Domain: Eukaryota
- Kingdom: Fungi
- Division: Ascomycota
- Class: Eurotiomycetes
- Order: Eurotiales
- Family: Aspergillaceae
- Genus: Penicillium
- Species: P. infra-aurantiacum

Binomial name
- Penicillium infra-aurantiacum Visagie, Houbraken & K. Jacobs 2014

Type strain
- CBS 137747, CV 1518, DAOM 241145, DTO 183-C3, CMV-2013u

Species of fungus

Penicillium infra-aurantiacum is a species of the genus of Penicillium.
