= Penicillium halotolerans =

Scientific classification
- Kingdom: Fungi
- Division: Ascomycota
- Class: Eurotiomycetes
- Order: Eurotiales
- Family: Aspergillaceae
- Genus: Penicillium
- Species: P. halotolerans

Binomial name
- Penicillium halotolerans Frisvad, Houbraken & Samson 2012

Type strain
- CBS 131537, DTO 148-H9, DTO 148H9, IBT 4315

Species of fungus

Penicillium halotolerans is a species of the genus of Penicillium which has the ability to tolerate 5% NaCl.
