= Penicillium jiangxiense =

Scientific classification
- Kingdom: Fungi
- Division: Ascomycota
- Class: Eurotiomycetes
- Order: Eurotiales
- Family: Aspergillaceae
- Genus: Penicillium
- Species: P. jiangxiense

Binomial name
- Penicillium jiangxiense Kong, H.Z.; Liang, Z.Q. 2003

Type strain
- CGMCC 3.6521

Species of fungus

Penicillium jiangxiense is a species of the genus of Penicillium which was isolated in Jiangxi in China.
