= Penicillium inusitatum =

Scientific classification
- Kingdom: Fungi
- Division: Ascomycota
- Class: Eurotiomycetes
- Order: Eurotiales
- Family: Aspergillaceae
- Genus: Penicillium
- Species: P. inusitatum

Binomial name
- Penicillium inusitatum Scott, D.B. 1968

Type strain
- ATCC 186.22, ATCC 18622, CBS 351.67, CSIR 1096, FRR 1163, IFO 9580, IMI 136214, NBRC 9580, NRRL 5810, NRRL A-17118

Synonyms
- Eupenicillium inusitatum

Species of fungus

Penicillium inusitatum is a species of the genus of Penicillium.
