= Penicillium terrigenum =

Scientific classification
- Kingdom: Fungi
- Division: Ascomycota
- Class: Eurotiomycetes
- Order: Eurotiales
- Family: Aspergillaceae
- Genus: Penicillium
- Species: P. terrigenum

Binomial name
- Penicillium terrigenum Seifert, Houbraken, Frisvad & Samson 2011

Type strain
- CBS 127354, DTO 9D4, IBT 30769

Species of fungus

Penicillium terrigenum is a species of fungus in the genus Penicillium which was isolated from soil in Hawaii in the United States.
