= Penicillium levitum =

Scientific classification
- Kingdom: Fungi
- Division: Ascomycota
- Class: Eurotiomycetes
- Order: Eurotiales
- Family: Aspergillaceae
- Genus: Penicillium
- Species: P. levitum

Binomial name
- Penicillium levitum Raper, K.B.; Fennell, D.I. 1948

Type strain
- ATCC 10464, CBS 345.48, FRR 0705, IFO 6101, IFO 8849, IMI 039735, MUCL 38759, NBRC 6101, NBRC 8849, NRRL 705, QM 1877, Thom 5521

Synonyms
- Carpenteles levitum, Eupenicillium levitum, Eupenicillium javanicum var. levitum

Species of fungus

Penicillium levitum is an anamorph species of the genus of Penicillium.
