= Penicillium lehmanii =

Scientific classification
- Domain: Eukaryota
- Kingdom: Fungi
- Division: Ascomycota
- Class: Eurotiomycetes
- Order: Eurotiales
- Family: Aspergillaceae
- Genus: Penicillium
- Species: P. lehmanii

Binomial name
- Penicillium lehmanii Pitt, J.I. 1980

Species of fungus

Penicillium lehmanii is a species of the genus of Penicillium.
