= Penicillium tardochrysogenum =

Scientific classification
- Kingdom: Fungi
- Division: Ascomycota
- Class: Eurotiomycetes
- Order: Eurotiales
- Family: Aspergillaceae
- Genus: Penicillium
- Species: P. tardochrysogenum

Binomial name
- Penicillium tardochrysogenum Frisvad, Houbraken & Samson 2012

Type strain
- CBS 132200, DTO 149-B9, DTO 149B9, IBT 30075

Species of fungus

Penicillium tardochrysogenum is a filamentous species of fungus in the genus Penicillium which produces penicillin, secalonic acids D and secalonic acids F.
