= Penicillium roseopurpureum =

Scientific classification
- Kingdom: Fungi
- Division: Ascomycota
- Class: Eurotiomycetes
- Order: Eurotiales
- Family: Aspergillaceae
- Genus: Penicillium
- Species: P. roseopurpureum

Binomial name
- Penicillium roseopurpureum Dierckx, R.P. 1901

Type strain
- CBS 148.83, CECT 2753, Quintanilla 1134

Synonyms
- Penicillium carmineoviolaceum, Penicillium carmino-violaceum, Penicillium vaccaeorum, Citromyces sanguifluus, Citromyces cesiae

Species of fungus

Penicillium roseopurpureum is an anamorph species of fungus in the genus Penicillium which produces Carviolin.
