= Penicillium mimosinum =

Scientific classification
- Kingdom: Fungi
- Division: Ascomycota
- Class: Eurotiomycetes
- Order: Eurotiales
- Family: Aspergillaceae
- Genus: Penicillium
- Species: P. mimosinum

Binomial name
- Penicillium mimosinum A.D. Hocking 1980

Type strain
- ATCC 52512, CBS 659.80, FRR 1875, IFO 30692, IFO 31754, IMI 223991, MUCL 38972, NBRC 30692, NBRC 31754

Species of fungus

Penicillium mimosinum is an anamorph species of fungus in the genus Penicillium.
