= Penicillium kongii =

Scientific classification
- Domain: Eukaryota
- Kingdom: Fungi
- Division: Ascomycota
- Class: Eurotiomycetes
- Order: Eurotiales
- Family: Aspergillaceae
- Genus: Penicillium
- Species: P. kongii

Binomial name
- Penicillium kongii Wang B., Wang L. 2013

Type strain
- AS 3.15329, HMAS 244382

Species of fungus

Penicillium kongii is a terverticillate species of the genus of Penicillium which was isolated from plant leaves in China.
