= Penicillium punicae =

Scientific classification
- Domain: Eukaryota
- Kingdom: Fungi
- Division: Ascomycota
- Class: Eurotiomycetes
- Order: Eurotiales
- Family: Aspergillaceae
- Genus: Penicillium
- Species: P. punicae

Binomial name
- Penicillium punicae Hyang B. Lee, P.M. Kirk & T.T.T. Nguyen

Type strain
- KCTC 16066 IBT 11178

Species of fungus

Penicillium punicae is a species of fungus in the genus Penicillium.
