= Penicillium mariae-crucis =

Scientific classification
- Kingdom: Fungi
- Division: Ascomycota
- Class: Eurotiomycetes
- Order: Eurotiales
- Family: Aspergillaceae
- Genus: Penicillium
- Species: P. mariae-crucis

Binomial name
- Penicillium mariae-crucis Quintanilla, J.A. 1982

Type strain
- CBS 271.83, CECT 2742, IMI 256075, Quintanilla 977

Species of fungus

Penicillium mariae-crucis is a species of the genus of Penicillium.
