= Penicillium shennonghianum =

Scientific classification
- Domain: Eukaryota
- Kingdom: Fungi
- Division: Ascomycota
- Class: Eurotiomycetes
- Order: Eurotiales
- Family: Aspergillaceae
- Genus: Penicillium
- Species: P. shennonghianum

Binomial name
- Penicillium shennonghianum H. Z. Kong & Z. T. Qi 1988

Species of fungus

Penicillium shennonghianum is a species of fungus in the genus Penicillium.
