= Penicillium jacksonii =

Scientific classification
- Kingdom: Fungi
- Division: Ascomycota
- Class: Eurotiomycetes
- Order: Eurotiales
- Family: Aspergillaceae
- Genus: Penicillium
- Species: P. jacksonii

Binomial name
- Penicillium jacksonii Rivera, K.G.; Seifert, K.A. 2011

Type strain
- DAOM 239937

Species of fungus

Penicillium jacksonii is a species of the genus of Penicillium.
