= Penicillium malacaense =

Scientific classification
- Kingdom: Fungi
- Division: Ascomycota
- Class: Eurotiomycetes
- Order: Eurotiales
- Family: Aspergillaceae
- Genus: Penicillium
- Species: P. malacaense

Binomial name
- Penicillium malacaense Ramírez, C.; Martínez, A.T. 1980

Type strain
- ATCC 42241, BCRC 33342, CBS 160.81, CCRC 33342, IJFM 7093, IMI 253801, VKM F-2197

Species of fungus

Penicillium malacaense is an anamorph species of the genus of Penicillium.
