= Penicillium raciborskii =

Scientific classification
- Kingdom: Fungi
- Division: Ascomycota
- Class: Eurotiomycetes
- Order: Eurotiales
- Family: Aspergillaceae
- Genus: Penicillium
- Species: P. raciborskii

Binomial name
- Penicillium raciborskii Zalessky, K.M. 1927

Type strain
- ATCC 10488, Biourge 282, CBS 224.28, DSM 2422, FRR 2150, IFO 7676, IMI 040568, LSHB P92, MUCL 29246, NBRC 7676, NRRL 2150, QM 7620, Thom 5010.19

Species of fungus

Penicillium raciborskii is an anamorph species of fungus in the genus Penicillium which was isolated from soil in Poland.
