= Penicillium oblatum =

Scientific classification
- Kingdom: Fungi
- Division: Ascomycota
- Class: Eurotiomycetes
- Order: Eurotiales
- Family: Aspergillaceae
- Genus: Penicillium
- Species: P. oblatum

Binomial name
- Penicillium oblatum Pitt, J.I.; Hocking, A.D. 1985

Type strain
- ATCC 56979, CBS 258.87, FRR 2234, IFO 33091, IMI 288719, NBRC 33091, UAMH 5330

Species of fungus

Penicillium oblatum is an anamorph species of fungus in the genus Penicillium.
