= Penicillium subspinulosum =

Scientific classification
- Domain: Eukaryota
- Kingdom: Fungi
- Division: Ascomycota
- Class: Eurotiomycetes
- Order: Eurotiales
- Family: Aspergillaceae
- Genus: Penicillium
- Species: P. subspinulosum

Binomial name
- Penicillium subspinulosum Houbraken 2014

Type strain
- CBS 137946, DTO041-F2

Species of fungus

Penicillium subspinulosum is a species of fungus in the genus Penicillium which was isolated from soil in Poland.
