= Penicillium zhuangii =

Scientific classification
- Kingdom: Fungi
- Division: Ascomycota
- Class: Eurotiomycetes
- Order: Eurotiales
- Family: Aspergillaceae
- Genus: Penicillium
- Species: P. zhuangii

Binomial name
- Penicillium zhuangii Long Wang (2014)

Species of fungus

Penicillium zhuangii is a fungus species in the genus Penicillium. Described as new to science in 2014, it was isolated from plant leaves in China. It is morphologically similar to Penicillium lividum.
