= Penicillium jugoslavicum =

Scientific classification
- Kingdom: Fungi
- Division: Ascomycota
- Class: Eurotiomycetes
- Order: Eurotiales
- Family: Aspergillaceae
- Genus: Penicillium
- Species: P. jugoslavicum

Binomial name
- Penicillium jugoslavicum Ramírez, C.; Muntañola-Cvetkovic, M. 1984

Type strain
- ATCC 58913, CBS 192.87, FRR 3307, IJFM 7785, IMI 314508, KCTC 6560

Synonyms
- Penicillium yugoslavicum

Species of fungus

Penicillium jugoslavicum is an anamorph species of the genus of Penicillium which was isolated from seeds of Helianthus annuus L.
