= Penicillium parviverrucosum =

Scientific classification
- Kingdom: Fungi
- Division: Ascomycota
- Class: Eurotiomycetes
- Order: Eurotiales
- Family: Aspergillaceae
- Genus: Penicillium
- Species: P. parviverrucosum

Binomial name
- Penicillium parviverrucosum (K. Ando & Pitt) Houbraken & Samson 2011

Synonyms
- Torulomyces parviverrucosus

Species of fungus

Penicillium parviverrucosum is a species of fungus in the genus Penicillium.
