= Penicillium wellingtonense =

Scientific classification
- Kingdom: Fungi
- Division: Ascomycota
- Class: Eurotiomycetes
- Order: Eurotiales
- Family: Aspergillaceae
- Genus: Penicillium
- Species: P. wellingtonense

Binomial name
- Penicillium wellingtonense Houbraken, J.; Frisvad, J.C.; Cole, T.; Samson, R.A. 2011

Type strain
- CBS 130375, DTO 76C6, IBT 23557

Species of fungus

Penicillium wellingtonense is a species of fungus in the genus Penicillium.
