= Penicillium ornatum =

Scientific classification
- Kingdom: Fungi
- Division: Ascomycota
- Class: Eurotiomycetes
- Order: Eurotiales
- Family: Aspergillaceae
- Genus: Penicillium
- Species: P. ornatum

Binomial name
- Penicillium ornatum Udagawa, S. 1968

Type strain
- ATCC 18608, ATCC 48268, B-16575, CBS 190.68, CBS 190.78, FRR 0660, FRR 3471, IFO 13005, IFO 31739, IMI 137977, JCM 5028, KCC S-1025, KCTC 9711, MUCL 38808, NBRC 13005, NBRC 31739, NHL 6101, NHL 6106, NRRL 3471

Species of fungus

Penicillium ornatum is an anamorph species of the genus Penicillium.
