= Penicillium vasconiae =

Scientific classification
- Domain: Eukaryota
- Kingdom: Fungi
- Division: Ascomycota
- Class: Eurotiomycetes
- Order: Eurotiales
- Family: Aspergillaceae
- Genus: Penicillium
- Species: P. vasconiae

Binomial name
- Penicillium vasconiae Ramírez, C.; Martínez, A.T. 1980

Species of fungus

Penicillium vasconiae is a species of fungus in the genus Penicillium which was isolated in Madrid in Spain.
