= Penicillium sylvaticum =

Scientific classification
- Domain: Eukaryota
- Kingdom: Fungi
- Division: Ascomycota
- Class: Eurotiomycetes
- Order: Eurotiales
- Family: Aspergillaceae
- Genus: Penicillium
- Species: P. sylvaticum

Binomial name
- Penicillium sylvaticum Oudemans, C.A.J.A.; Koning, C.J. 1902

Type strain
- ATCC 18483, CBS 235.60, QM 8040

Synonyms
- Penicillium silvaticum

Species of fungus

Penicillium sylvaticum is a species of fungus in the genus Penicillium.
