= Penicillium sublateritium =

Scientific classification
- Domain: Eukaryota
- Kingdom: Fungi
- Division: Ascomycota
- Class: Eurotiomycetes
- Order: Eurotiales
- Family: Aspergillaceae
- Genus: Penicillium
- Species: P. sublateritium

Binomial name
- Penicillium sublateritium Biourge, P. 1923

Type strain
- ATCC 10502, Biourge 57, CBS 267.29, FRR 2071, IFO 6107, IMI 040549, IMI 040594, LSHB P55, MUCL 28655, NBRC 6107, NRRL 2071, QM 7652, Thom 4733.119

Species of fungus

Penicillium sublateritium is an anamorph species of fungus in the genus Penicillium.
