= Penicillium senticosum =

Scientific classification
- Kingdom: Fungi
- Division: Ascomycota
- Class: Eurotiomycetes
- Order: Eurotiales
- Family: Aspergillaceae
- Genus: Penicillium
- Species: P. senticosum

Binomial name
- Penicillium senticosum Scott, D.B. 1968

Type strain
- ATCC 18623, CBS 316.67, CSIR 1042, FRR 0533, IFO 9158, IMI 136211, IMI 216905, NBRC 9158

Synonyms
- Eupenicillium senticosum

Species of fungus

Penicillium senticosum is an anamorph species of fungus in the genus Penicillium.
