= Penicillium palmae =

Scientific classification
- Kingdom: Fungi
- Division: Ascomycota
- Class: Eurotiomycetes
- Order: Eurotiales
- Family: Aspergillaceae
- Genus: Penicillium
- Species: P. palmae

Binomial name
- Penicillium palmae Samson, R.A.; Stolk, A.C.; Frisvad, J.C. 1989

Type strain
- CBS 442.88, IMI 343640

Synonyms
- Talaromyces palmae

Species of fungus

Penicillium palmae is a fungus species of the genus Penicillium.
