= Penicillium spirillum =

Scientific classification
- Kingdom: Fungi
- Division: Ascomycota
- Class: Eurotiomycetes
- Order: Eurotiales
- Family: Aspergillaceae
- Genus: Penicillium
- Species: P. spirillum

Binomial name
- Penicillium spirillum Pitt, J.I. 1979

Type strain
- ATCC 10451, CBS 335.48, DSM 3705 FRR 2106, IFO 30885, IFO 31751, IMI 040593, MUCL 38799, NBRC 30885 NBRC 31751, NRRL 2106, NRRL A-1289, QM 1852

Synonyms
- Penicillium helicum; Talaromyces helicus; Talaromyces helicus var. helicus (teleomorph)

Species of fungus

Penicillium spirillum is an anamorph species of fungus in the genus Penicillium.
