= Penicillium nilense =

Scientific classification
- Kingdom: Fungi
- Division: Ascomycota
- Class: Eurotiomycetes
- Order: Eurotiales
- Family: Aspergillaceae
- Genus: Penicillium
- Species: P. nilense

Binomial name
- Penicillium nilense Pitt, J.I 1980

Type strain
- ATCC 10441, CBS 244.32, CGMCC 3.4473, CSIR 707, FRR 2090, IBT 14684, IFO 6094, IFO 8141, IFO 8447, IFO 8847, IMI 040580, MUCL 38798, NBRC 6094, NBRC 8141 NBRC 8447, NBRC 8847, NRRL 2090, QM 1, QM 1875

Species of fungus

Penicillium nilense is a species of fungus in the genus Penicillium.
