= Penicillium moldavicum =

Scientific classification
- Kingdom: Fungi
- Division: Ascomycota
- Class: Eurotiomycetes
- Order: Eurotiales
- Family: Aspergillaceae
- Genus: Penicillium
- Species: P. moldavicum

Binomial name
- Penicillium moldavicum Milko, A.A.; Beljakova, L.A. 1967

Type strain
- ATCC 18355, BKM F-922, CBS 574.90, CBS 627.67, FRR 0665, IMI 129966, VKM F-922

Species of fungus

Penicillium moldavicum is an anamorph species of the genus Penicillium.
