= Penicillium vancouverense =

Scientific classification
- Kingdom: Fungi
- Division: Ascomycota
- Class: Eurotiomycetes
- Order: Eurotiales
- Family: Aspergillaceae
- Genus: Penicillium
- Species: P. vancouverense

Binomial name
- Penicillium vancouverense Houbraken, Frisvad & Samson 2011

Type strain
- CBS 126323, DTO 82B8, IBT 20700, CBS 122400, CBS 122401

Species of fungus

Penicillium vancouverense is a species of fungus in the genus Penicillium which was isolated from soil under a maple tree in Vancouver in Canada.
