= Penicillium glycyrrhizacola =

Scientific classification
- Kingdom: Fungi
- Division: Ascomycota
- Class: Eurotiomycetes
- Order: Eurotiales
- Family: Aspergillaceae
- Genus: Penicillium
- Species: P. glycyrrhizacola

Binomial name
- Penicillium glycyrrhizacola A.J. Chen 2013

Species of fungus

Penicillium glycyrrhizacola is a species of the genus of Penicillium.
