= Penicillium tropicoides =

Scientific classification
- Domain: Eukaryota
- Kingdom: Fungi
- Division: Ascomycota
- Class: Eurotiomycetes
- Order: Eurotiales
- Family: Aspergillaceae
- Genus: Penicillium
- Species: P. tropicoides

Binomial name
- Penicillium tropicoides Houbraken, J.A.M.P.; Frisvad, J.C.; Samson, R.A. 2010

Type strain
- CBS 122410, IBT 29043

Species of fungus

Penicillium tropicoides is a species of fungus in the genus Penicillium.
