= Penicillium pasqualense =

Scientific classification
- Domain: Eukaryota
- Kingdom: Fungi
- Division: Ascomycota
- Class: Eurotiomycetes
- Order: Eurotiales
- Family: Aspergillaceae
- Genus: Penicillium
- Species: P. pasqualense

Binomial name
- Penicillium pasqualense Houbraken, Frisvad & Samson 2011

Type strain
- CBS 122402, CBS 124327, CBS 126329, CBS 126330

Species of fungus

Penicillium pasqualense is a species of the genus of Penicillium.
