= Penicillium goetzii =

Scientific classification
- Kingdom: Fungi
- Division: Ascomycota
- Class: Eurotiomycetes
- Order: Eurotiales
- Family: Aspergillaceae
- Genus: Penicillium
- Species: P. goetzii

Binomial name
- Penicillium goetzii J. Rogers, Frisvad, Houbraken & Samson 2012

Type strain
- DTO 088-G6, CBS 285.73

Species of fungus

Penicillium goetzii is a species of the genus of ascomycetous fungi.
