= Penicillium ootensis =

Scientific classification
- Domain: Eukaryota
- Kingdom: Fungi
- Division: Ascomycota
- Class: Eurotiomycetes
- Order: Eurotiales
- Family: Aspergillaceae
- Genus: Penicillium
- Species: P. ootensis

Binomial name
- Penicillium ootensis A.K. Gupta & S. Chauhan 1996

Species of fungus

Penicillium ootensis is a species of fungus in the genus Penicillium.
