= Penicillium humicola =

Scientific classification
- Domain: Eukaryota
- Kingdom: Fungi
- Division: Ascomycota
- Class: Eurotiomycetes
- Order: Eurotiales
- Family: Aspergillaceae
- Genus: Penicillium
- Species: P. humicola

Binomial name
- Penicillium humicola Oudemans, C.A.J.A.; Koning, C.J. 1902

Species of fungus

Penicillium humicola is a species of fungus in the genus Penicillium.
