= Penicillium ovatum =

Scientific classification
- Kingdom: Fungi
- Division: Ascomycota
- Class: Eurotiomycetes
- Order: Eurotiales
- Family: Aspergillaceae
- Genus: Penicillium
- Species: P. ovatum

Binomial name
- Penicillium ovatum Houbraken, J.; Samson, R.A. 2011

Synonyms
- Torulomyces ovatus

Species of fungus

Penicillium ovatum is a species of fungus in the genus Penicillium which was isolated from forest soil in Kuala Lumpur in Malaysia.
