= Penicillium rasile =

Scientific classification
- Kingdom: Fungi
- Division: Ascomycota
- Class: Eurotiomycetes
- Order: Eurotiales
- Family: Aspergillaceae
- Genus: Penicillium
- Species: P. rasile

Binomial name
- Penicillium rasile Pitt, J.I. 1979

Type strain
- ATCC 10464, CBS 345.48, FRR 0705, IFO 6101, IFO 8849, IMI 039735, MUCL 38759, NBRC 6101, NBRC 8849, NRRL 705, QM 1877, Thom 5521

Species of fungus

Penicillium rasile is a species of fungus in the genus Penicillium.
