= Penicillium griseum =

Scientific classification
- Domain: Eukaryota
- Kingdom: Fungi
- Division: Ascomycota
- Class: Eurotiomycetes
- Order: Eurotiales
- Family: Aspergillaceae
- Genus: Penicillium
- Species: P. griseum

Binomial name
- Penicillium griseum Biourge, P. 1923

Synonyms
- Citromyces griseus

Species of fungus

Penicillium griseum is an anamorph species of the genus of Penicillium.
