= Penicillium humicoloides =

Scientific classification
- Kingdom: Fungi
- Division: Ascomycota
- Class: Eurotiomycetes
- Order: Eurotiales
- Family: Aspergillaceae
- Genus: Penicillium
- Species: P. humicoloides

Binomial name
- Penicillium humicoloides (Bills & Heredia) S.W. Peterson, Jurjevic, Bills, Stchigel, Guarro & F.E. Vega 2010

Synonyms
- Merimbla humicoloides

Species of fungus

Penicillium humicoloides is a species of the genus of Penicillium.
