= Penicillium svalbardense =

Scientific classification
- Domain: Eukaryota
- Kingdom: Fungi
- Division: Ascomycota
- Class: Eurotiomycetes
- Order: Eurotiales
- Family: Aspergillaceae
- Genus: Penicillium
- Species: P. svalbardense

Binomial name
- Penicillium svalbardense Frisvad, Sonjak & Gunde-Cimerman 2007

Type strain
- CBS 122416

Species of fungus

Penicillium svalbardense is a species of fungus in the genus Penicillium which was isolated from arctic glacial ice.
