= Penicillium lenticrescens =

Scientific classification
- Kingdom: Fungi
- Division: Ascomycota
- Class: Eurotiomycetes
- Order: Eurotiales
- Family: Aspergillaceae
- Genus: Penicillium
- Species: P. lenticrescens

Binomial name
- Penicillium lenticrescens Visagie, Seifert & Samson 2014

Species of fungus

Penicillium lenticrescens is a species of the genus of Penicillium.
