= Penicillium severskii =

Scientific classification
- Kingdom: Fungi
- Division: Ascomycota
- Class: Eurotiomycetes
- Order: Eurotiales
- Family: Aspergillaceae
- Genus: Penicillium
- Species: P. severskii

Binomial name
- Penicillium severskii Schekhovtsov 1981

Type strain
- CBS 438.88, FRR 3306, IJFM 19000, VKM F-2542

Species of fungus

Penicillium severskii is a species of fungus in the genus Penicillium.
