= Penicillium sizovae =

Scientific classification
- Kingdom: Fungi
- Division: Ascomycota
- Class: Eurotiomycetes
- Order: Eurotiales
- Family: Aspergillaceae
- Genus: Penicillium
- Species: P. sizovae

Binomial name
- Penicillium sizovae Baghd. 1968

Type strain
- ATCC 48712, CBS 413.69, FRR 0518, IMI 140344, VKM F-1073

Species of fungus

Penicillium sizovae is an anamorph species of fungus in the genus Penicillium which produces agroclavine-I and epoxyagroclavine-I.
