= Penicillium limosum =

Scientific classification
- Kingdom: Fungi
- Division: Ascomycota
- Class: Eurotiomycetes
- Order: Eurotiales
- Family: Aspergillaceae
- Genus: Penicillium
- Species: P. limosum

Binomial name
- Penicillium limosum Ueda, S. 1995

Type strain
- CBS 339.97

Species of fungus

Penicillium limosum is a species of the genus of Penicillium which was isolated from marine sediment.
