= Penicillium sajarovii =

Scientific classification
- Kingdom: Fungi
- Division: Ascomycota
- Class: Eurotiomycetes
- Order: Eurotiales
- Family: Aspergillaceae
- Genus: Penicillium
- Species: P. sajarovii

Binomial name
- Penicillium sajarovii Quintanilla, J.A. 1981

Type strain
- CBS 277.83, CECT 2751, IMI 259992, Quintanilla 1099

Species of fungus

Penicillium sajarovii is a species of fungus in the genus Penicillium.
