= Penicillium variabile =

Scientific classification
- Kingdom: Fungi
- Division: Ascomycota
- Class: Eurotiomycetes
- Order: Eurotiales
- Family: Aspergillaceae
- Genus: Penicillium
- Species: P. variabile

Binomial name
- Penicillium variabile Sopp, O.J. 1912

Type strain
- ATCC 10508, CBS 385.48, IMI 040040, NRRL 1048

Synonyms
- Talaromyces variabilis

Species of fungus

Penicillium variabile is an anamorph species of fungus in the genus Penicillium which has been isolated from permafrost deposits. Penicillium variabile produces rugulovasine A and rugulovasine B. This species occurs on wheat, flour, maize, rice, and barley, and it is also very common in indoor environments.

In the University of Newcastle, and publicated in the Journal of Parkinson’s Disease, was found that the Penicillium variable P16 is a main marker of the advancement of the Parkinson illness (with the loss of telomere length and P21)
