= Penicillium meridianum =

Scientific classification
- Domain: Eukaryota
- Kingdom: Fungi
- Division: Ascomycota
- Class: Eurotiomycetes
- Order: Eurotiales
- Family: Aspergillaceae
- Genus: Penicillium
- Species: P. meridianum

Binomial name
- Penicillium meridianum Scott, D.B. 1968

Type strain
- ATCC 18545, CBS 314.67, CSIR 1052, FRR 1165, IFO 31737, IFO 9159, IMI 136209, NBRC 31737, NBRC 9159, NRRL 5814, NRRL A-17117

Synonyms
- Eupenicillium meridianum

Species of fungus

Penicillium meridianum is an anamorph species of the genus Penicillium.
