= Penicillium purpureum =

Scientific classification
- Kingdom: Fungi
- Division: Ascomycota
- Class: Eurotiomycetes
- Order: Eurotiales
- Family: Aspergillaceae
- Genus: Penicillium
- Species: P. purpureum

Binomial name
- Penicillium purpureum Stolk, A.C.; Samson, R.A. 1972

Type strain
- ATCC 24069, ATCC 52513, BCRC 32369, CBS 475.71, CCRC 32369, FRR 1731, IFO 31755, IMI 181546, MUCL 38970, NBRC 31755, UAMH 3553

Synonyms
- Talaromyces purpureus (teleomorph)

Species of fungus

Penicillium purpureum is a species of fungus in the genus Penicillium.
