= Penicillium hoeksii =

Scientific classification
- Kingdom: Fungi
- Division: Ascomycota
- Class: Eurotiomycetes
- Order: Eurotiales
- Family: Aspergillaceae
- Genus: Penicillium
- Species: P. hoeksii

Binomial name
- Penicillium hoeksii Houbraken 2014

Type strain
- CBS 137776, DTO 192-H4

Species of fungus

Penicillium hoeksii is a species of the genus of Penicillium.
