= Penicillium osmophilum =

Scientific classification
- Kingdom: Fungi
- Division: Ascomycota
- Class: Eurotiomycetes
- Order: Eurotiales
- Family: Aspergillaceae
- Genus: Penicillium
- Species: P. osmophilum

Binomial name
- Penicillium osmophilum Stolk & Veenb.-Rijks 1974

Type strain
- ATCC 48362, CBS 462.72, FRR 1969, IBT 14679, IMI 189583

Synonyms
- Eupenicillium osmophilum

Species of fungus

Penicillium osmophilum is a species of fungus in the genus Penicillium which was isolated from agricultural soil in Wageningen in the Netherlands
