= Penicillium tsitsikammaense =

Scientific classification
- Domain: Eukaryota
- Kingdom: Fungi
- Division: Ascomycota
- Class: Eurotiomycetes
- Order: Eurotiales
- Family: Aspergillaceae
- Genus: Penicillium
- Species: P. tsitsikammaense

Binomial name
- Penicillium tsitsikammaense Houbraken 2014

Species of fungus

Penicillium tsitsikammaense is a species of fungus in the genus Penicillium which was isolated from forest soil from the Tsitsikama forest near Knysna in the Cape Province in South Africa.
