= Penicillium loliense =

Scientific classification
- Kingdom: Fungi
- Division: Ascomycota
- Class: Eurotiomycetes
- Order: Eurotiales
- Family: Aspergillaceae
- Genus: Penicillium
- Species: P. loliense

Binomial name
- Penicillium loliense Pitt, J.I. 1980

Type strain
- ATCC 52252, B 40028, B 51919, BCRC 32760, CBS 643.80, CCRC 32760, FRR 1798, IFO 30689, IHEM 3738, IHEM 3903, IMI 216901, MUCL 31325, MUCL 34590, NBRC 30689, NRRL 2148, S-11

Synonyms
- Talaromyces loliensis

Species of fungus

Penicillium loliense is an anamorph species of the genus of Penicillium.
