= Penicillium hypomycetis =

Scientific classification
- Domain: Eukaryota
- Kingdom: Fungi
- Division: Ascomycota
- Class: Eurotiomycetes
- Order: Eurotiales
- Family: Aspergillaceae
- Genus: Penicillium
- Species: P. hypomycetis

Binomial name
- Penicillium hypomycetis Saccardo, P.A. 1886

Species of fungus

Penicillium hypomycetis is a species of the genus of Penicillium.
