= Penicillium terrenum =

Scientific classification
- Domain: Eukaryota
- Kingdom: Fungi
- Division: Ascomycota
- Class: Eurotiomycetes
- Order: Eurotiales
- Family: Aspergillaceae
- Genus: Penicillium
- Species: P. terrenum

Binomial name
- Penicillium terrenum Scott, D.B. 1968

Species of fungus

Penicillium terrenum is an anamorph species of fungus in the genus Penicillium. Georegion is New Zealand.
