= Penicillium lineatum =

Scientific classification
- Kingdom: Fungi
- Division: Ascomycota
- Class: Eurotiomycetes
- Order: Eurotiales
- Family: Aspergillaceae
- Genus: Penicillium
- Species: P. lineatum

Binomial name
- Penicillium lineatum Pitt, J.I. 1980

Type strain
- ATCC 10501, CBS 377.48, CCT 4375, FRR 0717, IAM 13775, IAM 14606, IFO 6106, IMI 039741, IMI 039741ii, JCM 23037, MUCL 38764, NBRC 6106, NRRL 717, QM 1857, Thom CAMERON NO.1, UAMH 5156, VKM F-2044

Synonyms
- Paecilomyces lineatus

Species of fungus

Penicillium lineatum is a species of the genus of Penicillium.
