= Penicillium spathulatum =

Scientific classification
- Domain: Eukaryota
- Kingdom: Fungi
- Division: Ascomycota
- Class: Eurotiomycetes
- Order: Eurotiales
- Family: Aspergillaceae
- Genus: Penicillium
- Species: P. spathulatum

Binomial name
- Penicillium spathulatum Frisvad & Samson 2012

Type strain
- CBS 117192, IBT 22220, IBT 24432

Species of fungus

Penicillium spathulatum is a species of fungus in the genus Penicillium which produces asperphenamate.
