= Penicillium griseolum =

Scientific classification
- Domain: Eukaryota
- Kingdom: Fungi
- Division: Ascomycota
- Class: Eurotiomycetes
- Order: Eurotiales
- Family: Aspergillaceae
- Genus: Penicillium
- Species: P. griseolum

Binomial name
- Penicillium griseolum Smith, G. 1957

Type strain
- ATCC 18239, CBS 277.58, FRR 2671, IFO 8175, IMI 071626, LSH BB323, NRRL 2671, QM 7523

Species of fungus

Penicillium griseolum is an anamorph species of the genus of Penicillium.
