= Penicillium rubefaciens =

Scientific classification
- Kingdom: Fungi
- Division: Ascomycota
- Class: Eurotiomycetes
- Order: Eurotiales
- Family: Aspergillaceae
- Genus: Penicillium
- Species: P. rubefaciens

Binomial name
- Penicillium rubefaciens Quintanilla, J.A. 1982

Type strain
- CBS 145.83, CECT 2752, IMI 351268, Quintanilla 1133

Species of fungus

Penicillium rubefaciens is a species of fungus in the genus Penicillium which has been isolated from sandy soil.
