= Penicillium quebecense =

Scientific classification
- Kingdom: Fungi
- Division: Ascomycota
- Class: Eurotiomycetes
- Order: Eurotiales
- Family: Aspergillaceae
- Genus: Penicillium
- Species: P. quebecense

Binomial name
- Penicillium quebecense Houbraken, Frisvad & Samson 2011

Type strain
- IBT 29050, DTO 9B8, CBS 101623

Species of fungus

Penicillium quebecense is a species of fungus in the genus Penicillium.
