= Penicillium udagawae =

Scientific classification
- Domain: Eukaryota
- Kingdom: Fungi
- Division: Ascomycota
- Class: Eurotiomycetes
- Order: Eurotiales
- Family: Aspergillaceae
- Genus: Penicillium
- Species: P. udagawae

Binomial name
- Penicillium udagawae Stolk, A.C.; Samson, R.A. 1972

Type strain
- ATCC 52327, CBS 579.72, CBS 597.72, FRR 1727, IFO 8808, IMI 197482, MUCL 38969, NBRC 8808, NHL 6089

Species of fungus

Penicillium udagawae is an anamorph species of fungus in the genus Penicillium.
