= Penicillium ludwigii =

Scientific classification
- Domain: Eukaryota
- Kingdom: Fungi
- Division: Ascomycota
- Class: Eurotiomycetes
- Order: Eurotiales
- Family: Aspergillaceae
- Genus: Penicillium
- Species: P. ludwigii

Binomial name
- Penicillium ludwigii Udagawa, S.I.; Awao, T. 1969

Species of fungus

Penicillium ludwigii is an anamorph species of the genus of Penicillium.
