= Penicillium meloforme =

Scientific classification
- Domain: Eukaryota
- Kingdom: Fungi
- Division: Ascomycota
- Class: Eurotiomycetes
- Order: Eurotiales
- Family: Aspergillaceae
- Genus: Penicillium
- Species: P. meloforme

Binomial name
- Penicillium meloforme Udagawa, S.I.; Horie, Y. 1973

Type strain
- ATCC 28049, CBS 445.74, FRR 1560, IFO 9715, IMI 216903, MUCL 38810, NBRC 9715, NHL 6468, NRRL 6031

Species of fungus

Penicillium meloforme is an anamorph species of the genus Penicillium.
