= Penicillium ramusculum =

Scientific classification
- Kingdom: Fungi
- Division: Ascomycota
- Class: Eurotiomycetes
- Order: Eurotiales
- Family: Aspergillaceae
- Genus: Penicillium
- Species: P. ramusculum

Binomial name
- Penicillium ramusculum Batista, A.C.; Maia, H.S. 1955

Type strain
- ATCC 12292, CBS 251.56, FRR 3459, IMI 063546, IMUR 478, LSHB BB324, NRRL 3459, QM 7057

Species of fungus

Penicillium ramusculum is an anamorph, species of the genus of Penicillium.
