= Penicillium yarmokense =

Scientific classification
- Kingdom: Fungi
- Division: Ascomycota
- Class: Eurotiomycetes
- Order: Eurotiales
- Family: Aspergillaceae
- Genus: Penicillium
- Species: P. yarmokense

Binomial name
- Penicillium yarmokense Baghdadi, V.V. 1968

Type strain
- CBS 410.69, FRR 0520, FRR 0520 VKM F-1076, IMI 140346, VKM F-1076

Species of fungus

Penicillium yarmokense is a species of fungus in the genus Penicillium which was isolated from soil near Es-Suveida in Syria.
