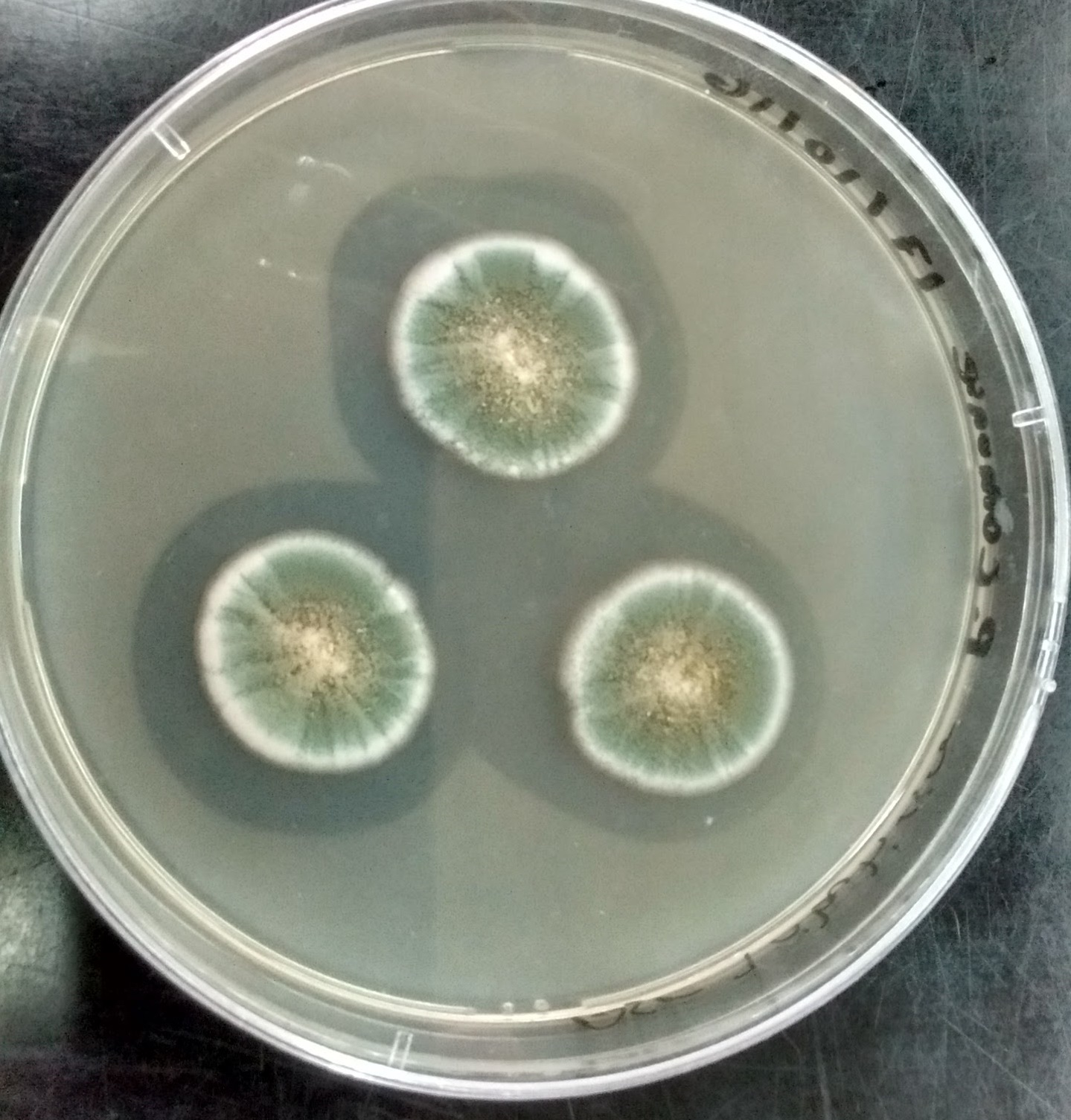
- P. commune isolate from cheese in agar

Scientific classification
- Kingdom: Fungi
- Division: Ascomycota
- Class: Eurotiomycetes
- Order: Eurotiales
- Family: Aspergillaceae
- Genus: Penicillium
- Species: P. commune

Binomial name
- Penicillium commune Charles Thom (1910)

Synonyms
- Penicillium flavoglaucum Biourge (1923); Penicillium fuscoglaucum Biourge (1923); Penicillium lanosogriseum Thom (1930); Penicillium lanosoviride Thom (1930); Penicillium psittacinum Thom (1930); Penicillium ochraceum var. macrosporum Thom (1930); Penicillium cyclopium var. album G. Sm (1951); Penicillium roqueforti var. punctatum S. Abe (1956)

= Penicillium commune =

Species of fungus

Penicillium commune is an indoor fungus belonging to the genus Penicillium. It is known as one of the most common fungi spoilage moulds on cheese. It also grows on and spoils other foods such as meat products and fat-containing products like nuts and margarine. Cyclopiazonic acid and regulovasine A and B are the most important mycotoxins produced by P. commune. The fungus is the only known species to be able to produce both penitrem A and roquefortine. Although this species does not produce penicillin, it has shown to have anti-pathogenic activity. There are no known plant, animal or human diseases caused by P. commune.

== History and taxonomy ==
The fungus species was first described by the American mycologist Dr. Charles Thom in 1910.

=== Internal ===
Penicillium commune is considered an ancestral wild relative of the fungus species P. camemberti, a mould commonly used in the production of soft cheese. Both species are similar in their ability to produce cyclopiazonic acid (CPA), a metabolite not normally produced by members of the genus Penicillium. Being the wild ancestor of P. camemberti, the name P. commune is then paraphyletic.

Internal phylogeny of "P. commune" molds

- CPA(+)
  - P. fuscoglaucum
  - - P. biforme
    - P. camemberti
      - var. "camemberti"
      - var. "caseifulvum" CPA(-)

Ropars et al. (2020).

Different authors have resolved the issue differently; the fine-grained approach by Ropars et al. 2020 deliminates:

- P. fuscoglaucum, the wild blue-green mold. Traditionally included in P. commune.
- The domesticated clade, which is overwhelmingly found in food-related environments. Most strains also carry CheesyTer and Wallaby, horizontally transferred regions associated with competitiveness on cheese.
  - P. biforme, the gray-green mold used in cheesemaking. Used in the bluish Brie cheese from before the 20th century. Still used to make hard and blue cheeses and dried sausages. Common dairy spoilage mold. Traditionally included in P. commune.
  - P. camemberti, a cheese-making species.
    - P. camemberti var. "caseifulvum", a grey-green mold without the ability to make CPA. Used to make some soft cheeses. Also a dairy spoilage mold.
    - P. camemberti var. "camemberti", a white mold that appeared in the 20th century. CPA-positive. Used in soft and blue cheeses (Camembert, Brie, and Neufchatel) as well as sausages.

The existence of these clades within a species complex that cannot be further distinguished using common "barcoding" genes such as BenA is a biological fact, agreed upon by different authors. Divergence occurs in how each author draw the boundaries. A finer "splitter" approach recognizes P. caseifulvum, but this split cannot be distinguished from P. camemberti even using a few microsatellite markers. (This is the current [2014] mainstream approach with P. fuscoglaucum instead labeled P. commune.) The "lumper" approach would group everything under P. commune, which while biologically defensible is not as useful.

=== External ===
In their 1949 monograph of the genus, Raper and Thom treated P. commune and P. lanosum in subsection Lanata. Since then, there has been two additional species added: P. echinosporum (Nehira) and P. giganteum (Roy and Singh) to the series.

This species is treated by Frisvad (2004) in Penicillium subgenus Penicillium section Viridicata series Camemberti, along with P. camemberti, P. caseifulvum, P. palitans, P. crustosum, and P. atramentosum.

This species is treated by Visagie et al. (2014) in Section Fasciculata.

The wild sister species of P. commune sensu lato is Penicillium palitans.

== Growth and morphology ==
The asexually produced spores (i.e., conidia) of P. commune are smooth and spherical, ranging from 3.5 to 5.0 μm in diameter, borne in disordered chains on conidiophores with rough-walled stipes. The conidium-bearing stalks are either produced singularly or in bundled groups known as fascicles. The stalk lengths are usually 200 to 400 μm. Conidia are dull grey green or grey turquoise in colour.

Penicillium commune can be distinguished by its fast growth on creatine sucrose neutral agar (CSN) while showing a slow growth rate on malt extract agar (MEA) and restricted growth on Czapek medium (CZA) and Czapek yeast extract agar (CYA). The appearance of colonies on MEA ranges from soft, velvety and grown in unison to granular and barely grown together. The underside of colonies produced on MEA are pale-yellow coloured and sun-yellow coloured. Colonies on CZA and CYA range from soft and velvety to slightly fluffy with exudate present that can be clear to brown coloured. In addition, the underside of the colonies grown on CZA and CYA are creamy/ dull yellow to brown-yellow in colour. The production of purple pigment has also been observed.

No sexual stage has been described. However, genetic analysis indicate that none of the P. commune (in the "lumper" sense, sensu lato) genomes sequenced include loss-of-function mutations related to sexual reproduction. P. fuscoglaucum is likely sexual as there is a 1:1 balance between the MAT1-1 and MAT1-2 mating types and obvious recombination signatures. P. biforme shows a distortion in the ratio favoring MAT1-2 as well as signatures, consistent with early human clonal intervention in open-air environments where sexual reproduction occurs in a limited fashion. P. camemberti is fully clonal, being all MAT1-2 and showing no signs of recombination.

== Physiology ==
Like many other Penicillium species, P. commune is able to grow in temperatures resembling that of the refrigerator. However, the optimum temperature for the species is 25 °C while the maximum limit is 37 °C. The minimal water activities (a_{w}) for germination and growth for P. commune is 0.83a_{w} which is near the lower side for fungal growth as most fungal activity is inhibited at 0.70a_{w} or less. The fungus species shows no sign of growth in environments consisting of 20% CO_{2} and less than 5% O_{2}. Although, in the presence of 80% CO_{2} and 20% O_{2}, there are signs of limited growth.P. commune expresses lipolytic activity.

The main mycotoxins produced by P. commune are cyclopiazonic acid and regulovasine A and B. Other secondary metabolites produced include: cyclopenin, cyclopenol, dehydrocyclopeptin, cylcopeptin, viridicatol, viridicatin, cyclopaldic acid, cyclopolic acid. However, the mentioned metabolites above are produced with unknown toxicity and not all isolates of P. commune produce them, with cyclopaldic acid being the only exception. Two neurotoxins, penitrem A and roquefortine, are produced by P. commune culture obtained from cottonseed. Aside from P. roqueforti, P. commune is the only other Penicillium species known to produce roquefortine. The cottonseed study suggested that the neurotoxic effects of this species are minimal. This species does not cause disease in plants, animals or humans.

== Habitat and ecology ==
Penicillium commune is found indoors and most commonly, on food products. The main habitat for the fungus is cheese, including both hard and soft cheese. With cheese being produced in an environment that is characterized by refrigeration temperatures, low oxygen availability, lipid breakdown activity, preservation actions of free fatty acids and reduced water availability, the physiology of P. commune allows the fungus to still grow in these conditions. Therefore, as it is known as one of the most successful spoilage moulds of cheese, it is also the main reason for their spoilage. In addition, the fungus is frequently found as a mould growing on dry-cured meat products as well. This species has been isolated from other food products such as nuts, fats, margarine, fermented sausages, yogurt, sour cream, lactose powder, and high fat-filling cakes. It has been known to cause "phenol defect" in foods like ripening Italian ham, apples, pears and flours where the taste and smell of these products are off due to spoilage by the fungus. Aside from colonizing on food products, the fungus of P. commune has also been isolated from disposed used oil.

== Industrial and medical applications ==
Penicillium commune has shown promising activity in microbial biodegradation research in relation to environmental pollutants. A 2014 study identified the potential of this species to biodegrade industrial oil waste. Although the rate of bio-removing oil was dependent on volume of oil, pH level of culture and co-culture incubation period, optimal conditions resulted in a 95.4% removal rate of oil waste by P. commune. The fungus could be a new source in industrial application with respect to biodegradation of oil wastes in the environment using biological means.

Although P. commune has no known penicillin activity, an environmental isolate of the fungus has shown to produce statin and to anti-pathogenic products. The fungus species was able to significantly decrease the growth of two pathogenic bacteria, Pseudomonas aeruginosa and Staphylococcus aureus, on biofilms in a laboratory setting. In addition, there has been evidence of the production of lovastatin from the environmental isolate of P. commune. Along with its ability to improve the antibiotic performance of oxacillin, P. commune has shown to be a new promising source in the production of anti-pathogenic products for medical applications.
