= Penicillium psychrosexualis =

Scientific classification
- Domain: Eukaryota
- Kingdom: Fungi
- Division: Ascomycota
- Class: Eurotiomycetes
- Order: Eurotiales
- Family: Aspergillaceae
- Genus: Penicillium
- Species: P. psychrosexualis

Binomial name
- Penicillium psychrosexualis Houbraken & Samson (2010)

Type strain
- CBS 128137T

Species of fungus

Penicillium psychrosexualis is a filamentous fungus in the genus Penicillium. Described as new to science in 2010, the species was found growing on refrigerated moldy apples in the Netherlands. It is closely related to the blue cheese fungus P. roqueforti.

== Discovery ==
Penicillium psychrosexualis was isolated in 2008 from a wooden crate in a cold, controlled atmosphere storage containing apples covered by the white mold Fibulorhizoctonia psychrophila. This mold is restricted to growth under 20 °C (68 °F). The crate was kept under conditions that deter the growth of most fungi: temperatures of 1.5–2 °C (34.7–35.6 °F), oxygen levels of 1.0–1.5%, carbon dioxide levels of 2.0%, and a relative humidity of 92–95%. The Penicillium isolate was discovered during the culture of the white mold.

== Systematics ==
Molecular phylogenetic analyses of the Penicillium fungus were performed using DNA sequences of the internal transcribed spacer region, partial β-tubulin and calmodulin genes. This information, in addition to analysis of excreted chemicals and macro- and microscopical characteristics, demonstrated that P. psychrosexualis belongs in the series Roqueforti (genus Penicillium, subgenus Penicillium sect. Roqueforti). This is grouping of related species with similar physiological characteristics that includes P. paneum, P. carneum, and P. roqueforti.

== Description ==
Penicillium psychrosexualis cultures are velvety, bearing woolly tufts in the center, and colored dull to dark green when grown on Czapek yeast agar. The odor of the fungus is similar to its close relative P. roqueforti. P. psychrosexualis produces cleistothecia (closed, spherical fruitbodies from which ascospores are released when its walls break or split) when grown between the relatively low temperatures of 9 and 15 °C (48 and 59 °F); no cleistothecia were observered when grown at 25 °C (77 °F). The cleistothecia are initially white, soft, and sterile, but after about three to four months become pale orange-brown, typically measuring 100–175 μm in diameter. Ascospores are ellipsoidal, and measure 4–5 by 3–4 μm.

The fungus produces several secondary metabolites: andrastin A, mycophenolic acid, patulin, and roquefortine C. A chemically uncharacterized compound isolated from the fungus has been given the tentative name "fumu". The metabolite profile of P. psychrosexualis is similar to that of P. carneum, but the latter species lacks "fumu" while producing cyclopaldic acid, isofumigaclavine A, and penitrem A.
