= Penicillium tulipae =

Scientific classification
- Kingdom: Fungi
- Division: Ascomycota
- Class: Eurotiomycetes
- Order: Eurotiales
- Family: Aspergillaceae
- Genus: Penicillium
- Species: P. tulipae

Binomial name
- Penicillium tulipae Overy, D.P.; Frisvad, J.C. 2003

Type strain
- CBS 111217, CBS 109555

Species of fungus

Penicillium tulipae is a species of fungus in the genus Penicillium which produces penicillic acid, roquefortine C, roquefortine D, terrestric acid, glandicoline A, glandicoline B, meleagrin, oxaline, penitrem A and epineoxaline.
