= Penicillium caseifulvum =

Scientific classification
- Kingdom: Fungi
- Division: Ascomycota
- Class: Eurotiomycetes
- Order: Eurotiales
- Family: Aspergillaceae
- Genus: Penicillium
- Species: P. caseifulvum

Binomial name
- Penicillium caseifulvum Filtenborg & Frisvad 1998

Type strain
- CBS 108956, IBT 19782

Species of fungus

Penicillium caseifulvum is a fungus species of the genus of Penicillium which occurs on the surface of blue cheese and causes discoloration in form of brown spots.

While there exists a caseifulvum clade of gray-green cheese molds, this group is not distinguishable from Penicillium camemberti using a few microsatellite markers. It is commonly found on soft cheeses, being used to make Saint-Marcellin and Rigotte de Condrieu. Unlike its relatives also used in cheese-making, it does not produce cyclopiazonic acid due to a 2bp deletion in the CpaA gene.

== See also ==
- Penicillium commune § Taxonomy
- List of Penicillium species
