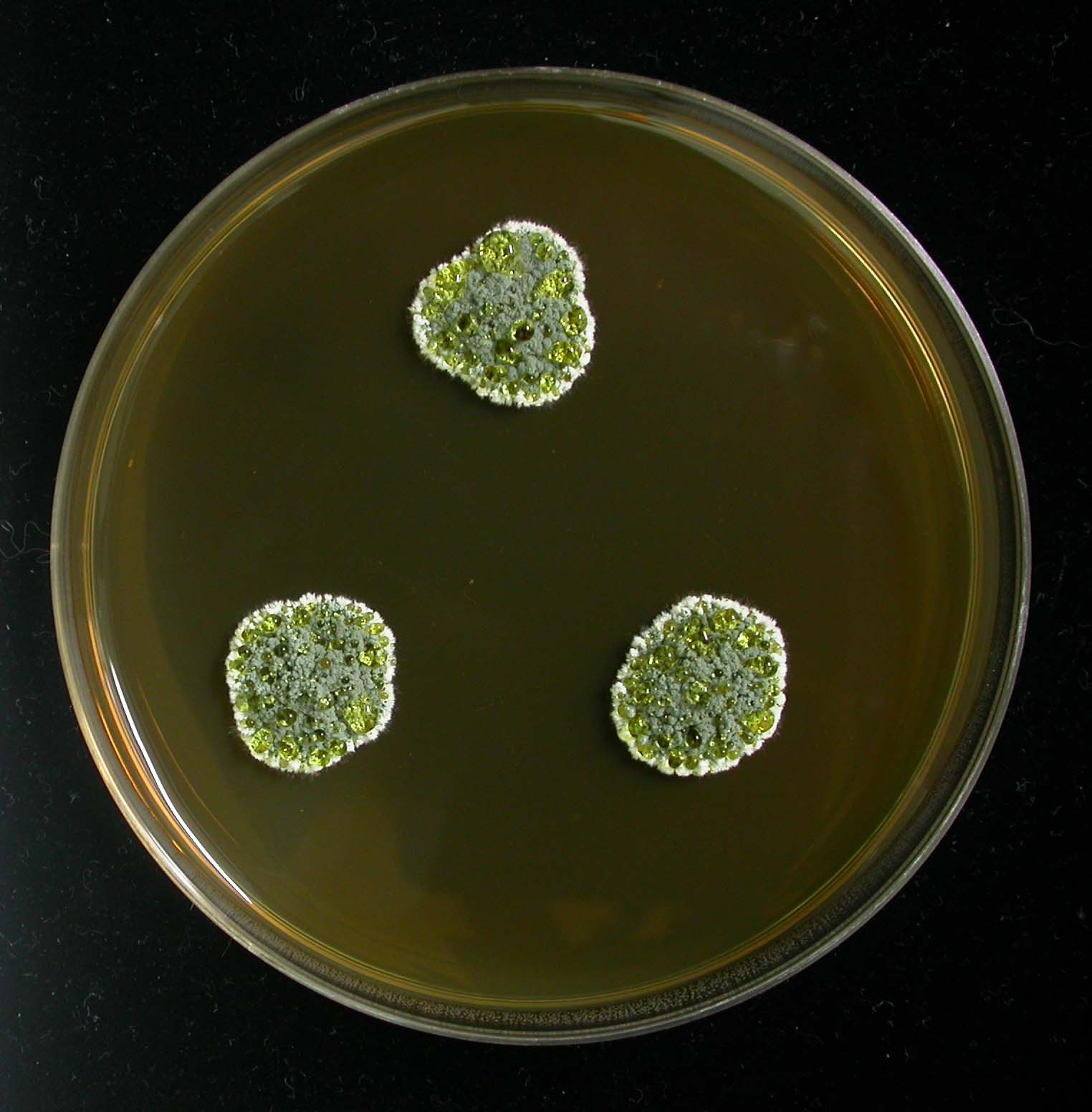

Scientific classification
- Domain: Eukaryota
- Kingdom: Fungi
- Division: Ascomycota
- Class: Eurotiomycetes
- Order: Eurotiales
- Family: Aspergillaceae
- Genus: Penicillium
- Species: P. glandicola

Binomial name
- Penicillium glandicola (Oudemans) Seifert & Samson 1985

Synonyms
- Coremium glandicola, Penicillium granulatum, Penicillium schneggii, Penicillium granulatum var. globosum

= Penicillium glandicola =

Species of fungus

Penicillium glandicola is an anamorph species of the genus of Penicillium which produces penitrem A, patulin, 2,4,6-trichloroanisole and roquefortine C
