= Penicillium coprophilum =

Scientific classification
- Domain: Eukaryota
- Kingdom: Fungi
- Division: Ascomycota
- Class: Eurotiomycetes
- Order: Eurotiales
- Family: Aspergillaceae
- Genus: Penicillium
- Species: P. coprophilum

Binomial name
- Penicillium coprophilum (Berkeley & M.A. Curtis) Seifert & Samson 1985

Synonyms
- Coremium coprophilum, Stilbum humanum, Pritzeliella caerulea, Pritzeliella coerulea

Species of fungus

Penicillium coprophilum is a species of the genus of Penicillium which produces roquefortine C, griseofulvin and oxaline.

== See also ==
- List of Penicillium species
