= Barceloneic acid =

Barceloneic acid may refer to:

- Barceloneic acid A
- Barceloneic acid B
- Barceloneic acid C
