= C16H16O7 =

The molecular formula C_{16}H_{16}O_{7} (molar mass: 320.29 g/mol, exact mass: 320.0896 u) may refer to:

- Austrocortirubin
- Barceloneic acid A
