= Penicillium flavigenum =

Scientific classification
- Kingdom: Fungi
- Division: Ascomycota
- Class: Eurotiomycetes
- Order: Eurotiales
- Family: Aspergillaceae
- Genus: Penicillium
- Species: P. flavigenum

Binomial name
- Penicillium flavigenum Frisvad & Samson 1997

Type strain
- CBS 419.89, IBT 21526, IBT 3091, IBT 3780, IBT 4727, IBT V1035, IFO 33246, IMI 293207, KIH P0238, NBRC 100458, NBRC 33246

Species of fungus

Penicillium flavigenum is a species of the genus of Penicillium which produces penitrem A, penicillin and roquefortine C.

== See also ==
- List of Penicillium species
