= Penicillium radicicola =

Scientific classification
- Domain: Eukaryota
- Kingdom: Fungi
- Division: Ascomycota
- Class: Eurotiomycetes
- Order: Eurotiales
- Family: Aspergillaceae
- Genus: Penicillium
- Species: P. radicicola

Binomial name
- Penicillium radicicola Overy, D.P.; Frisvad, J.C. 2003

Species of fungus

Penicillium radicicola is a species of fungus in the genus Penicillium which produces Roquefortine C and occurs on onions.
