= Aspergillus parvisclerotigenus =

Scientific classification
- Kingdom: Fungi
- Division: Ascomycota
- Class: Eurotiomycetes
- Order: Eurotiales
- Family: Aspergillaceae
- Genus: Aspergillus
- Species: A. parvisclerotigenus

Binomial name
- Aspergillus parvisclerotigenus (Mich. Saito & Tsuruta) Frisvad & Samson (2005)

Species of fungus

Aspergillus parvisclerotigenus is a species of fungus in the genus Aspergillus. It is from the Flavi section. The species was first described in 2005. A. parvisclerotigenus has been isolated in Nigeria and has been found to produce aflatoxin B1, aflatoxin B2, aflatoxin G1, aflatoxin G2, aflatrem, aflavarin, aspirochlorin, cyclopiazonic acid, kojic acid, and paspaline.
