= Beta-cyclopiazonate dehydrogenase =

beta-cyclopiazonate dehydrogenase

Identifiers
- EC no.: 1.21.99.1
- CAS no.: 9059-00-1

Databases
- BRENDA: enzyme data
- ExPASy: NiceZyme view
- KEGG: enzyme entry
- MetaCyc: metabolic pathway
- Rhea: reactions
- PDB structures: RCSB PDB PDBe PDBsum
- Gene Ontology: AmiGO / QuickGO
Search
- PMC: articles
- PubMed: articles
- NCBI: proteins

Beta-cyclopiazonate dehydrogenase (EC 1.21.99.1) is an enzyme that catalyzes the chemical reaction

beta-cyclopiazonate + acceptor $\rightleftharpoons$ alpha-cyclopiazonate + reduced acceptor

Thus, the two substrates of this enzyme are beta-cyclopiazonate and an acceptor, whereas its two products are alpha-cyclopiazonate and a reduced acceptor.

This enzyme belongs to the family of oxidoreductases, specifically those acting on X-H and Y-H to form an X-Y bond with other acceptors. The systematic name of this enzyme class is beta-cyclopiazonate:acceptor oxidoreductase (cyclizing). Other names in common use include beta-cyclopiazonate oxidocyclase, beta-cyclopiazonic oxidocyclase, and beta-cyclopiazonate:(acceptor) oxidoreductase (cyclizing). It employs one cofactor, FAD.
