= Penicillium dipodomyicola =

Scientific classification
- Domain: Eukaryota
- Kingdom: Fungi
- Division: Ascomycota
- Class: Eurotiomycetes
- Order: Eurotiales
- Family: Aspergillaceae
- Genus: Penicillium
- Species: P. dipodomyicola

Binomial name
- Penicillium dipodomyicola (Frisvad, Filtenborg & Wicklow) Frisvad 2000

Type strain
- CBS 173.87, IBT 21521, IMI 296935, NRRL 13487, NRRL A-27016

Synonyms
- Penicillium griseofulvum var. dipodomyicola

Species of fungus

Penicillium dipodomyicola is a species of the genus of Penicillium which produces peniphenone A, peniphenone B, peniphenone C, peniphenone D, cyclopiazonic acid and patulin.

== See also ==
- List of Penicillium species
