= Penicillium palitans =

Scientific classification
- Domain: Eukaryota
- Kingdom: Fungi
- Division: Ascomycota
- Class: Eurotiomycetes
- Order: Eurotiales
- Family: Aspergillaceae
- Genus: Penicillium
- Species: P. palitans

Binomial name
- Penicillium palitans Westling, R. 1911

Type strain
- ATCC 10477, CBS 107.11, FRR 2033, IBT 23034, IMI 040215, IMI 402155, LSHB P.126, LSHB P126, MUCL 39354, NRRL 2033, VKM F-3088

Species of fungus

Penicillium palitans is an anamorph species of fungus in the genus Penicillium which was isolated from cheese and ancient permafrost deposits. Penicillium palitans produces viridicatin, cyclopiazonic acid, roquefortine, palitantin and ochratoxin A
