= C28H38O7 =

The molecular formula C_{28}H_{38}O_{7} (molar mass: 486.60 g/mol, exact mass: 486.2618 u) may refer to:

- Bongkrek acid, or bongkrekic acid
- Andrastin A
