= Penicillium hordei =

Scientific classification
- Kingdom: Fungi
- Division: Ascomycota
- Class: Eurotiomycetes
- Order: Eurotiales
- Family: Aspergillaceae
- Genus: Penicillium
- Species: P. hordei

Binomial name
- Penicillium hordei Stolk, A.C. 1969

Type strain
- ATCC 22053, BCRC 32729, CBS 701.68, CCRC 32729, CECT 2290, FRR 0815, IBT 17804, IBT 6980, IFM 47732, IFO 32031, IMI 151748, isolate 8, KCTC 6404, MUCL 39550, MUCL 39559, NBRC 32031

Synonyms
- Penicillium hirsutum var. hordei

Species of fungus

Penicillium hordei is a species of the genus of Penicillium which produces corymbiferone and roquefortine C.
