= Aspergillus pseudotamarii =

Scientific classification
- Kingdom: Fungi
- Division: Ascomycota
- Class: Eurotiomycetes
- Order: Eurotiales
- Family: Aspergillaceae
- Genus: Aspergillus
- Species: A. pseudotamarii

Binomial name
- Aspergillus pseudotamarii Yoko Ito, S.W. Peterson, Wicklow & T. Goto (2001)

Species of fungus

Aspergillus pseudotamarii is a species of fungus in the genus Aspergillus. It is from the Flavi section. The species was first described in 2001. It has been shown to produce aflatoxin B1, aflatoxin B2, cyclopiazonic acid, and kojic acid.

== Growth and morphology ==
A. pseudotamarii has been cultivated on both Czapek yeast extract agar (CYA) plates and Malt Extract Agar Oxoid® (MEAOX) plates. The growth morphology of the colonies can be seen in the pictures below.

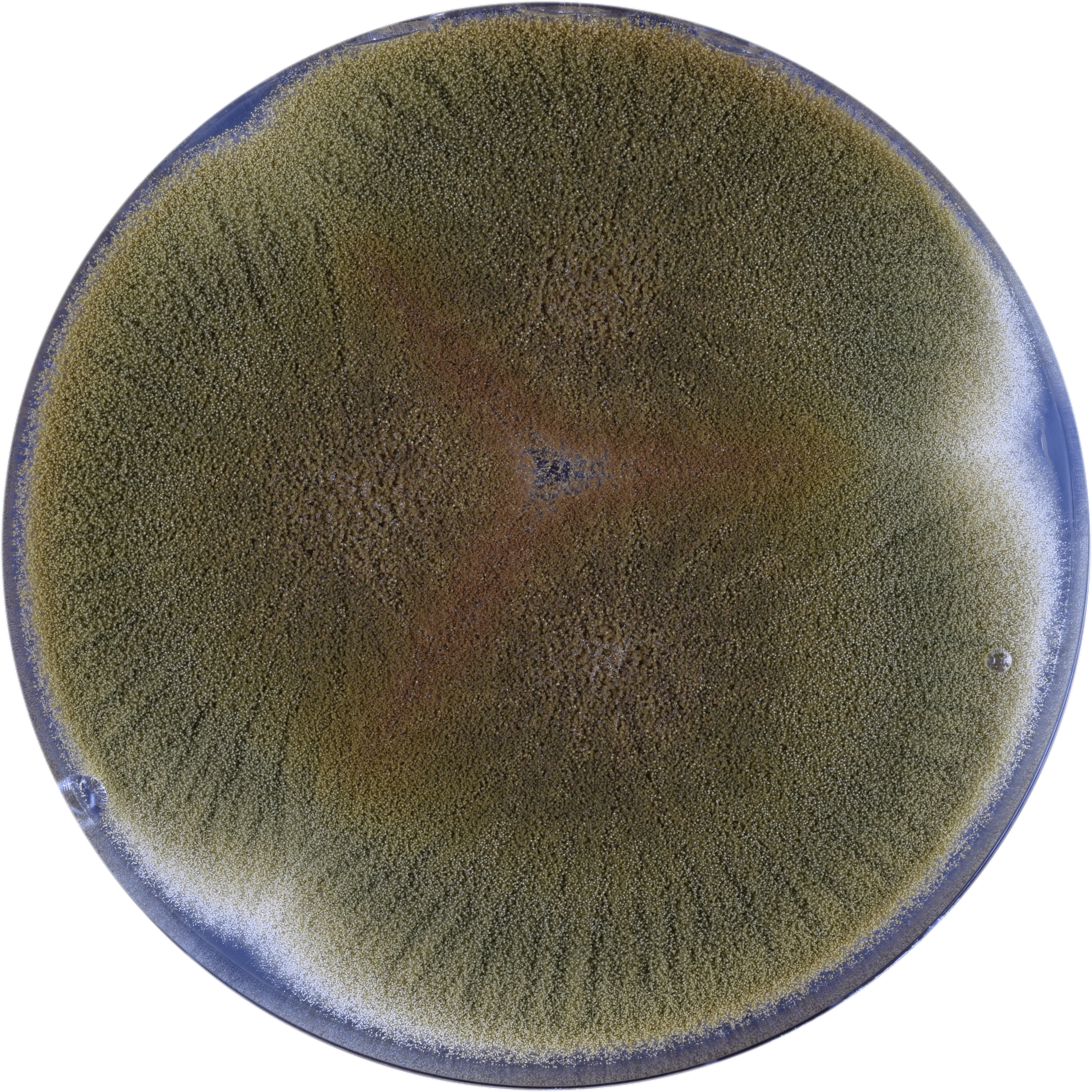
Aspergillus pseudotamarii growing on CYA plate

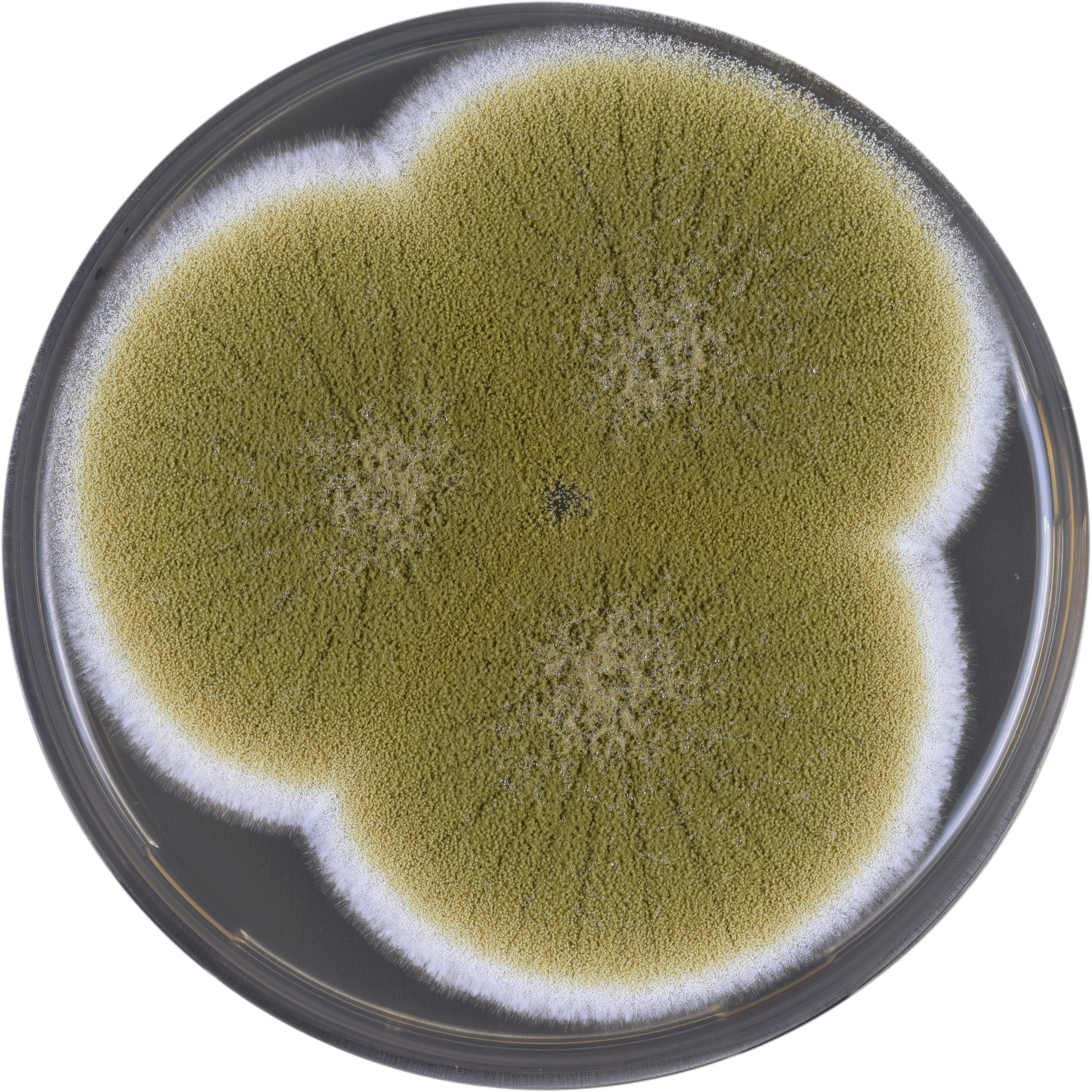
Aspergillus pseudotamarii growing on MEAOX plate
