= Penicillium venetum =

Scientific classification
- Domain: Eukaryota
- Kingdom: Fungi
- Division: Ascomycota
- Class: Eurotiomycetes
- Order: Eurotiales
- Family: Aspergillaceae
- Genus: Penicillium
- Species: P. venetum

Binomial name
- Penicillium venetum Frisvad 2000

Synonyms
- Penicillium hirsutum var. venetum

Species of fungus

Penicillium venetum is a species of fungus in the genus Penicillium which produces roquefortine C and roquefortine D.
