= Penicillium ochrochloron =

Scientific classification
- Kingdom: Fungi
- Division: Ascomycota
- Class: Eurotiomycetes
- Order: Eurotiales
- Family: Aspergillaceae
- Genus: Penicillium
- Species: P. ochrochloron

Binomial name
- Penicillium ochrochloron Biourge, P. 1923

Type strain
- ATCC 10540 CBS 357.48, FRR 0926, IMI 039806, MUCL 38775, NRRL 926, QM 7604, Thom 5710.1

Species of fungus

Penicillium ochrochloron is a species of fungus in the genus Penicillium which produces penitrem A.
