= Penicillium marinum =

Scientific classification
- Kingdom: Fungi
- Division: Ascomycota
- Class: Eurotiomycetes
- Order: Eurotiales
- Family: Aspergillaceae
- Genus: Penicillium
- Species: P. marinum

Binomial name
- Penicillium marinum Frisvad, J.; Samson, R.A. 2004

Type strain
- CBS 109550, IBT 14360

Species of fungus

Penicillium marinum is a species in the genus Penicillium which produces patulin and roquefortine C.
