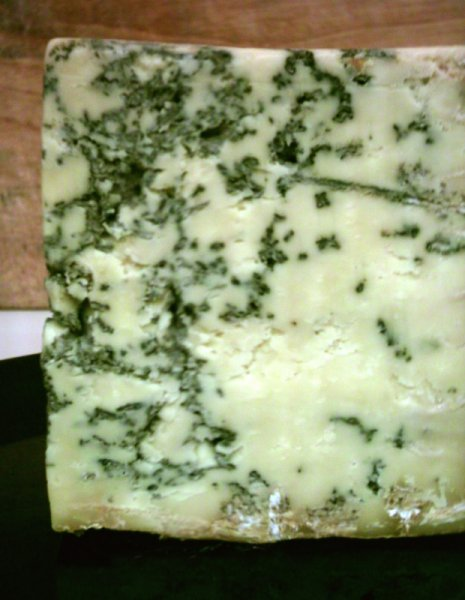
- Blue Stilton cheese, showing the blue-green mold veins produced by Penicillium roqueforti

Scientific classification
- Kingdom: Fungi
- Division: Ascomycota
- Class: Eurotiomycetes
- Order: Eurotiales
- Family: Aspergillaceae
- Genus: Penicillium
- Species: P. roqueforti

Binomial name
- Penicillium roqueforti Thom (1906)

Synonyms
- Penicillium roqueforti var. weidemannii Westling (1911); Penicillium weidemannii (Westling) Biourge (1923); Penicillium gorgonzolae Weid. (1923); Penicillium roqueforti var. viride Datt.-Rubbo (1938); Penicillium roqueforti var. punctatum S.Abe (1956); Penicillium conservandi Novobr. (1974)

= Penicillium roqueforti =

Species of fungus

Penicillium roqueforti is a common saprotrophic fungus in the genus Penicillium. Widespread in nature, it can be isolated from soil, decaying organic matter, and plants.

The major industrial uses of this fungus are the production of blue cheeses, flavouring agents, antifungals, polysaccharides, proteases, and other enzymes. The fungus has been a constituent of Roquefort, Stilton, Danish blue, Cabrales, and other blue cheeses. A few blue cheeses, such as Gorgonzola, are made instead with Penicillium glaucum.

== Classification ==
First described by the American mycologist Charles Thom in 1906, P. roqueforti was initially described as heterogeneous species of blue-green, sporulating fungi. They were grouped into different species based on phenotypic differences, but later combined into one species by Kenneth B. Raper and Thom (1949). The P. roqueforti group then got a reclassification in 1996 due to molecular analysis of ribosomal DNA sequences. Formerly divided into two varieties―cheese-making (P. roqueforti var. roqueforti) and patulin-making (P. roqueforti var. carneum)―P. roqueforti was reclassified in 1996 into three species: P. roqueforti, P. carneum, and P. paneum. The current sister species is P. psychrosexualis, described in 2010. P. carneum is in turn sister to the roqueforti-psychrosexualis clade. P. paneum is more distantly related.

The complete genome sequence of P. roqueforti was published in 2014. Genetic analysis and comparison of many different strains isolated from various environments around the world indicate that it is a genetically diverse species.

Using genome comparison, it is shown that Penicillium roqueforti is divided into five populations: silage/spoiled food, lumber/spoiled food, Roquefort PDO, non-Roquefort, and Termignon. The Roquefort and non-Roquefort populations reflect different domestication events. The Termignon population is most closely related to the non-Roquefort population.

== Description ==
As this fungus does not form visible fruiting bodies, descriptions are based on macromorphological characteristics of fungal colonies growing on various standard agar media, and on microscopic characteristics. When grown on Czapek yeast autolysate agar or yeast-extract sucrose (YES) agar, P. roqueforti colonies are typically 40 mm in diameter, olive brown to dull green (dark green to black on the reverse side of the agar plate), with a velutinous (velvety) texture. Grown on malt extract agar, colonies are 50 mm in diameter, dull green in color (beige to greyish green on the reverse side), with arachnoid (with many spider-web-like fibers) colony margins. Another characteristic morphological feature of this species is its production of asexual spores in phialides with a distinctive brush-shaped configuration.

Evidence for a sexual stage in P. roqueforti has been found, based in part on the presence of functional mating-type genes, and most of the important genes known to be involved in meiosis. In 2014, researchers reported inducing the growth of sexual structures in P. roqueforti, including ascogonia, cleistothecia, and ascospores.

P. roqueforti can tolerate cold temperatures, low oxygen levels, and both alkali and weaker acid preservatives, which allows the fungi to thrive and be found in dairy environments, such as cheese. On the other hand, it also spoils refrigerated foods and meats, along with breads and silage.

=== Horizontal gene transfer ===
The clonal non-Roquefort group and the Termignon group carry two Starship elements, CheesyTer and Wallaby, that confers a growth speed advantage on cheese and improves microbial competition. They have been horizontally transferred to other Penicillium species, some of which have also been domesticated by humans for cheese-making.

There are five other cheese-related horizontally transferred regions of unknown function.

== Uses ==
The chief industrial use of this species is the production of blue cheeses, such as its namesake Roquefort, Bleu de Bresse, Bleu du Vercors-Sassenage, Brebiblu, Cabrales, Cambozola (Blue Brie), Cashel Blue, Danish blue, Maytag Blue, Swedish Ädelost, Polish Rokpol, Finnish Aurajuusto made from cow's milk, blue varieties of Turkish civil cheese, Fourme d'Ambert, Fourme de Montbrison, Lanark Blue, Shropshire Blue, and Stilton, and some varieties of Bleu d'Auvergne and Gorgonzola. (Other blue cheeses, including Bleu de Gex and Rochebaron, use Penicillium glaucum.)

When placed into cream and aerated, P. roqueforti produces concentrated blue cheese flavoring, a type of enzyme-modified cheese. A similar flavoring can be produced using other sources of fat, such as coconut oil.

Strains of the microorganism are also used to produce compounds that can be employed as antibiotics, flavours, and fragrances, uses not regulated under the U.S. Toxic Substances Control Act.

The organism can also be used for the production of proteases and specialty chemicals, such as methyl ketones, including 2-heptanone.

== Secondary metabolites ==
Considerable evidence indicates that most strains are capable of producing harmful secondary metabolites (alkaloids and other mycotoxins) under certain growth conditions. Aristolochene is a sesquiterpenoid compound produced by P. roqueforti, and is likely a precursor to the toxin known as PR toxin, made in large amounts by the fungus. PR-toxin has been implicated in incidents of mycotoxicoses resulting from eating contaminated grains. However, PR toxin is not stable in cheese, and breaks down to the less toxic PR imine.

Secondary metabolites of P. roqueforti, named andrastins A–D, are found in blue cheese. The andrastins inhibit proteins involved in the efflux of anticancer drugs from multidrug-resistant cancer cells, indicating potential value in cancer treatment.

P. roqueforti also produces the neurotoxin roquefortine C. However, the levels of roquefortine C in cheese made from it are usually too low to produce toxic effects.

Recent research has shown significant differences in metabolite production between P. roqueforti populations.

- The two non-cheese populations found in lumber and silage produce high levels of PR toxin and andrastins. They produce a low level of mycophenolic acid (MPA). They maintain higher metabolite diversity, particularly in fatty acids and terpenoids, which may provide competitive advantages in more complex environments, where fungi must compete with other microorganisms.
- The non-Roquefort population is the most "domesticated" of the cheese population. It is wholly incapable of producing PR toxin and MPA due to loss-of-function mutations in the two pathways. (Specifically, a guanine to adenine nuceltide substitution in ORF 11 of the PR toxin biosynthetic cluster introduces a premature stop codon; a deletion in the lipase/esterase domain of the mpaC gene prevents MPA synthesis.) It produces minimal levels of andrastin A due to down-regulation.
- The Roquefort population shows no genetic mutations in PR toxin genes, they still do not produce the toxin, suggesting downregulation of the pathway. They produce high levels of MPA and andrastin.
- The Termignon population shows low PR toxin production, high MPA production and low andrastin production.

== See also ==
- Amaurodon caeruleocaseus, a fungus named after blue cheese
- List of Penicillium species
