= Penicillium albocoremium =

Scientific classification
- Domain: Eukaryota
- Kingdom: Fungi
- Division: Ascomycota
- Class: Eurotiomycetes
- Order: Eurotiales
- Family: Aspergillaceae
- Genus: Penicillium
- Species: P. albocoremium

Binomial name
- Penicillium albocoremium (Frisvad) Frisvad 2000

Synonyms
- Penicillium hirsutum var. albocoremium Frisvad, in Frisvad & Filtenborg 1990

Species of fungus

Penicillium albocoremium is a fungus species in the genus Penicillium growing in Allium cepa.

Penicillium albocoremium produces barceloneic acid B and andrastin A.
