= PR toxin =

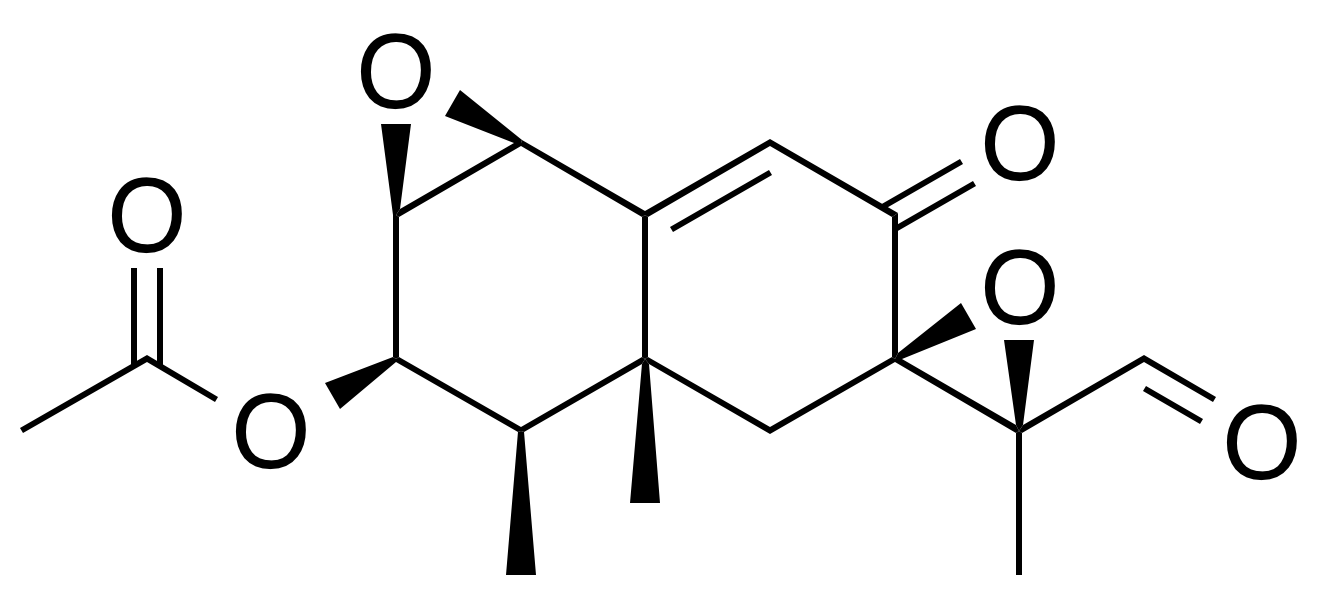

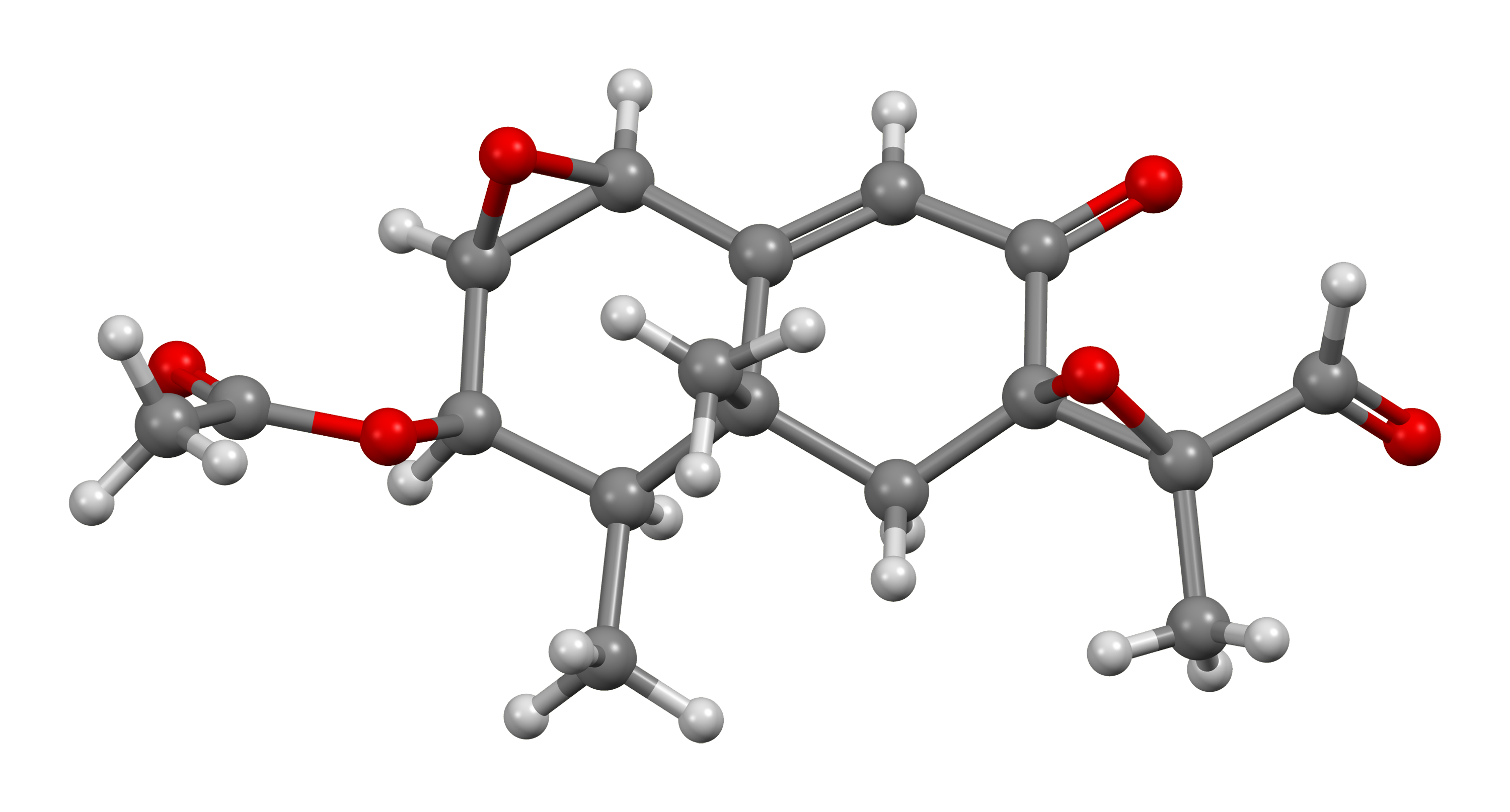

Names
- IUPAC name (11S)-8,12-Dioxo-1β,2β:7,11-diepoxy-7α-eremophil-9-en-3β-yl acetate
- Systematic IUPAC name (1aR,2R,2′R,3R,3′S,3aR,7bS)-3′-Formyl-3,3′,3a-trimethyl-6-oxo-1a,2,3a,4,6,7b-hexahydro-3H-spiro[naphtho[1,2-b]oxirene-5,2′-oxiran]-2-yl acetate

Identifiers
CAS Number	56299-00-4
3D model (JSmol)	Interactive image
ChEBI	CHEBI:7883
ChEMBL	ChEMBL4176158
ChemSpider	389737
KEGG	C06079
PubChem CID	440907
UNII	F9W0X88AFM
CompTox Dashboard (EPA)	DTXSID40971740
- InChI: InChI=1S/C17H20O6/c1-8-12(21-9(2)19)14-13(22-14)10-5-11(20)17(6-15(8,10)3)16(4,7-18)23-17/h5,7-8,12-14H,6H2,1-4H3/t8-,12+,13-,14+,15+,16+,17-/m0/s1 Key: GSPFUBNBRPVALJ-VIEAGMIOSA-N
- SMILES: C[C@H]1[C@H]([C@@H]2[C@@H](O2)C3=CC(=O)[C@@]4(C[C@]13C)[C@@](O4)(C)C=O)OC(=O)C
- Except where otherwise noted, data are given for materials in their standard state (at 25 °C [77 °F], 100 kPa). Infobox references

Penicillin Roquefort toxin (PR toxin) is a mycotoxin produced by the fungus Penicillium roqueforti. In 1973, PR toxin was first partially characterized by isolating moldy corn on which the fungi had grown. Although its lethal dose was determined shortly after the isolation of the chemical, details of its toxic effects were not fully clarified until 1982 in a study with mice, rats, anesthetized cats and preparations of isolated rat auricles.

== Structure and reactivity ==
PR toxin contains multiple functional groups, including acetoxy (CH_{3}COO-), aldehyde (-CHO), α,β-unsaturated ketone (-C=C-CO) and two epoxides. The aldehyde group on C-12 is directly involved in the biological activity as removal leads to inactivation of the compound. The two epoxide groups do not play an important role, as removal showed no difference in activity. When exposed to air, PR toxin may decompose. How and why this happens, is however not known.

== Synthesis ==
PR toxin is derived from the 15-carbon hydrocarbon aristolochene, a sesquiterpene produced from farnesyl diphosphate catalyzed by the enzyme aristolochene synthase. Aristolochene then gains an alcohol, a ketone, and an additional alkene, mediated by hydroxysterol oxidase and quinone oxidoreductase. Addition of the fused-epoxide oxygen by P450 monooxygenase gives eremofortin B. Epoxidation of the isopropenyl sidechain, again by P450 monooxygenase, and addition of the acetyl group by an acetyltransferase gives eremofortin A. A short-chain oxidoreductase oxidizes a methyl group on the side-chain to eremofortin C, the primary alcohol analog of PR toxin (incorrectly illustrated in the following diagram), which is then further oxidized by a short-chain alcohol dehydrogenase to give the aldehyde.

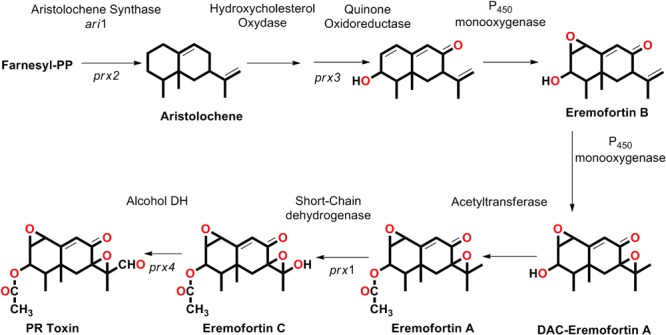

Eremofortin C has been isolated from microbial sources and found to be in a spontaneous equilibrium between an open-chain hydroxy–ketone structure and a lactol form.

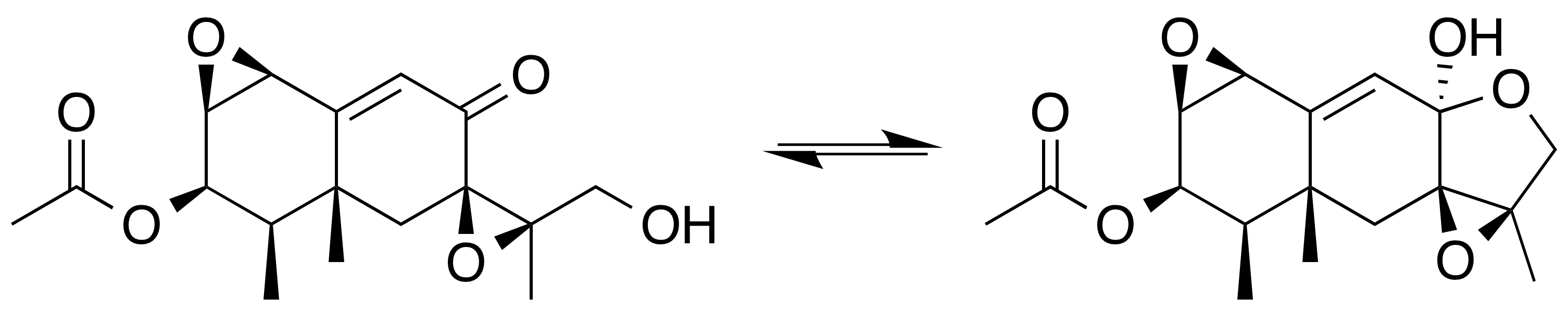

== Genetic Regulation ==
Recent genomic and metabolomic studies have shown that PR toxin production in Penicillium roqueforti is transcriptionally regulated by the PR toxin biosynthetic gene cluster. This cluster spans approximately 25 kilobase pairs and contains eleven open reading frames (ORFs). Key gene products include the ari1 locus, which encodes the rate-limiting enzyme, aristolochene synthase (ORF2); two dehydrogenases (ORF1 and ORF4); quinone oxidase (ORF3); an oxidoreductase (ORF1); an acetyltransferase (ORF8); a transcriptional regulator (ORF10); and four cytochrome P450 monooxygenases (ORF5, ORF6, ORF9, and ORF11). The PR toxin biosynthetic gene cluster is generally conserved across Penicillium species, though not universally identical.

Commercial Penicillium roqueforti strains commonly used in blue cheese manufacturing exhibit lower PR toxin expression. In these strains, a frequent guanine-to-adenine (G→A) mutation in ORF11, encoding a cytochrome P450 monooxygenase, introduces a premature stop codon which disrupts the final steps of PR toxin biosynthesis. This mutation leads to the accumulation of biosynthetic intermediates eremofortin A and B. The nonfunctional allele resulting from this nonsense mutation is thought to have become fixed in commercial Penicillium roqueforti via domestication; moreover, human selection or relaxed selective pressure occurred within the fungal-cheese environment. The mutation results in a phenotype considered favorable for food safety, as it lowers the concentrations of PR toxin within unspoiled products.

Furthermore, the microaerophilic conditions and the presence of nitrogenous compounds such as amino acids, casein, amines, and ammonium salts in the blue cheese milieu promote the degradation of PR toxin. When degraded, PR toxin forms metabolites PR acid (C_{17}H_{20}O_{7}), PR imine (C_{17}H_{21}O_{5}N), and PR amide (C_{17}H_{21}O_{6}N) which exhibit lower toxicity and are thought to have minimal deleterious effects on chromatin architecture and protein synthesis. These degradation products, unlike PR toxin and its eremofortin derivatives, have been detected in blue cheeses with relative abundance and are considered less hazardous to human health.

== Metabolism ==
Different experiments have shown the effects of the PR toxin on liver cells in culture (in vitro) and in the liver (in vivo).

=== In vitro ===
The PR toxin caused an inhibition of the incorporation of amino acids. These results show that the toxin was responsible for altering the translating process. Together with some earlier experiments it has been proved that the PR toxin was indeed active on the cell metabolism. Another interesting finding is the decreased activity of respiratory control and oxidative phosphorylation in the (isolated) mitochondria of the liver .

Apparently the amount of polysomes wasn't the determining factor, the inhibition was not decreased by increasing the amount of polysomes. The increase of pH 5 enzymes on the other hand, had a significant inhibitory effect. A higher concentration of pH 5 enzymes made the inhibitory effect less effective. These findings proved that the PR toxin was not altering the polysomes but in some way dysfunctions the pH 5 enzymes.

=== In vivo ===
When the PR toxin was directly administered to rats, protein synthesis in the liver was not as high as it normally would be. This in vivo administration showed that the isolated cells from the rat's liver had a much lower transcriptional capacity.

The process did not alter the uptake of amino acids in the liver, but the translational process was exclusively affected. The toxic effect of this toxin is as expected close with the fact that the process of protein synthesis is inhibited. However the real toxic effect could be that some required proteins aren't made in a proper amount.

== Mechanism of action ==
Multiple experiments have shown the different effects of PR toxin: it can cause damage to the liver and kidney, can induce carcinogenicity, and can in vivo inhibit DNA replication, protein synthesis, and transcription. Most experiments on the effect of the PR toxin focus on the inhibition of protein synthesis and impairment of the liver.

The PR toxin dysfunctions the transcriptional process in the liver. RNA polymerases I & II, the two main RNA polymerase systems in the liver, are affected by the toxin. The toxin needs no further enzymatic conversion to exert its effects on these systems. The liver seems to be the most influenced organ by the PR toxin.

== Toxicity ==
The toxicity of PR toxin was measured both intraperitoneally as well as orally. The first determined median lethal dose of pure PR toxin intraperitoneal in weanling rats was 11 mg/kg. The oral median lethal dose was 115 mg/kg. The same study reported that ten minutes after an oral dose of 160 mg/kg, the animals experienced breathing problems that eventually led to death.

Acute Rat studies (mg/kg)

- LDLo test, via oral route: 115

- LD50 test, intraperitoneal route: 11.6

- LD50 test, intravenous: 8.2

Acute Mouse studies (mg/kg)

- LD50 test, via oral route: 72

- LD50 test, intraperitoneal: 2

- LD50 test, intravenous: 2

An acute human study has yet to be done, so no LD50 test results or doses are known yet. However, there is one case report from 1982 in which toxic effects are described on a human. This person was working in a factory in which the blue cheese was produced. The mold of Penicillium roqueforti was inhaled by this person and she developed hypersensitivity pneumonitis. Because of this lung inflammation, the person experienced among other things coughing, dyspnea, reduced lung volumes and hypoxemia. Antibodies against the mold were found afterwards in serum and lavage fluid. However, the LD50 values have not yet been determined.

== Effects on animals ==
Studies of the effects on animals were done on mice, rats, anesthetized cats and preparations of isolated rat auricle. Toxic effects in mice and rats included abdominal writhing, decrease of motor activity and respiration rate, weakness of the hind legs and ataxia.

The effects were different for the different ways PR toxin was taken up. When the median lethal dose was ingested orally, the pathology was described as swollen-gas filled stomach and intestines as well as edema and congestion in the lungs. The kidney showed degenerative changes as well as hemorrhage.

If PR toxin was injected intraperitoneally, cats, mice and rats developed ascites fluid and edema of the lungs and scrotum. While intravenous injection showed, for the same animals, large volumes of pleural and pericardial volumes as well as lung edema.

In conclusion, the tissue cells and blood vessels were directly damaged by PR toxin. This caused leakage of fluid resulting among other things in edema of the lungs and ascites fluid. Also, the damage on the blood vessels resulted in increased capillary permeability. This increased permeability lead to a decrease in blood volume and direct damage to the vital organs including lungs, kidneys, liver and heart.
