= Penicillium carneum =

Scientific classification
- Kingdom: Fungi
- Division: Ascomycota
- Class: Eurotiomycetes
- Order: Eurotiales
- Family: Aspergillaceae
- Genus: Penicillium
- Species: P. carneum

Binomial name
- Penicillium carneum Boysen, M.; Skouboe, P.; Frisvad, J.C.; Rossen, L. 1996

Type strain
- CBS 112297, IBT 6884

Synonyms
- Penicillium roqueforti var. carneum

Species of fungus

Penicillium carneum is a fungus species of the genus of Penicillium. Penicillium roqueforti var. carneum was reclassified to Penicillium carneum. P. carneum was isolated from spoiled meat products, silage, rye bread, water, beer, cheese, mouldy barkers yeast and cork. P. carneum produces patulin, penicillic acid, penitrem A, mycophenolic acid roquefortines.

== See also ==
- List of Penicillium species
