= Penicillium crustosum =

Scientific classification
- Domain: Eukaryota
- Kingdom: Fungi
- Division: Ascomycota
- Class: Eurotiomycetes
- Order: Eurotiales
- Family: Aspergillaceae
- Genus: Penicillium
- Species: P. crustosum

Binomial name
- Penicillium crustosum Thom (1930)

Synonyms
- Penicillium expansum var. crustosum, Penicillium solitum var. crustosum, Penicillium terrestre, Penicillium aurantiogriseum var. poznaniense, Penicillium schmidtii, Penicillium pseudocasei, Penicillium farinosum

Species of fungus

Penicillium crustosum is a blue-green or blue-grey mold that can cause food spoilage, particularly of protein-rich foods such as meats and cheeses. It is identified by its complex biseriate conidiophores on which phialides produce asexual spores. It can grow at fairly low temperatures (it is a psychrophile), and in low water activity environments.

Penicillium crustosum produces mycotoxins, most notoriously the neurotoxic penitrems, including the best known penitrem toxin, penitrem A, and including penitrems A through G. Penitrem G has been shown to have insecticidal activity. In addition, P. crustosum can produce thomitrems A and E, and roquefortine C. Consumption of foods spoiled by this mold can cause transient neurological symptoms such as tremors. In dogs, symptoms can include vomiting, convulsion, tremors, ataxia, and tachycardia.
