= Langres cheese =

French cheese

Langres
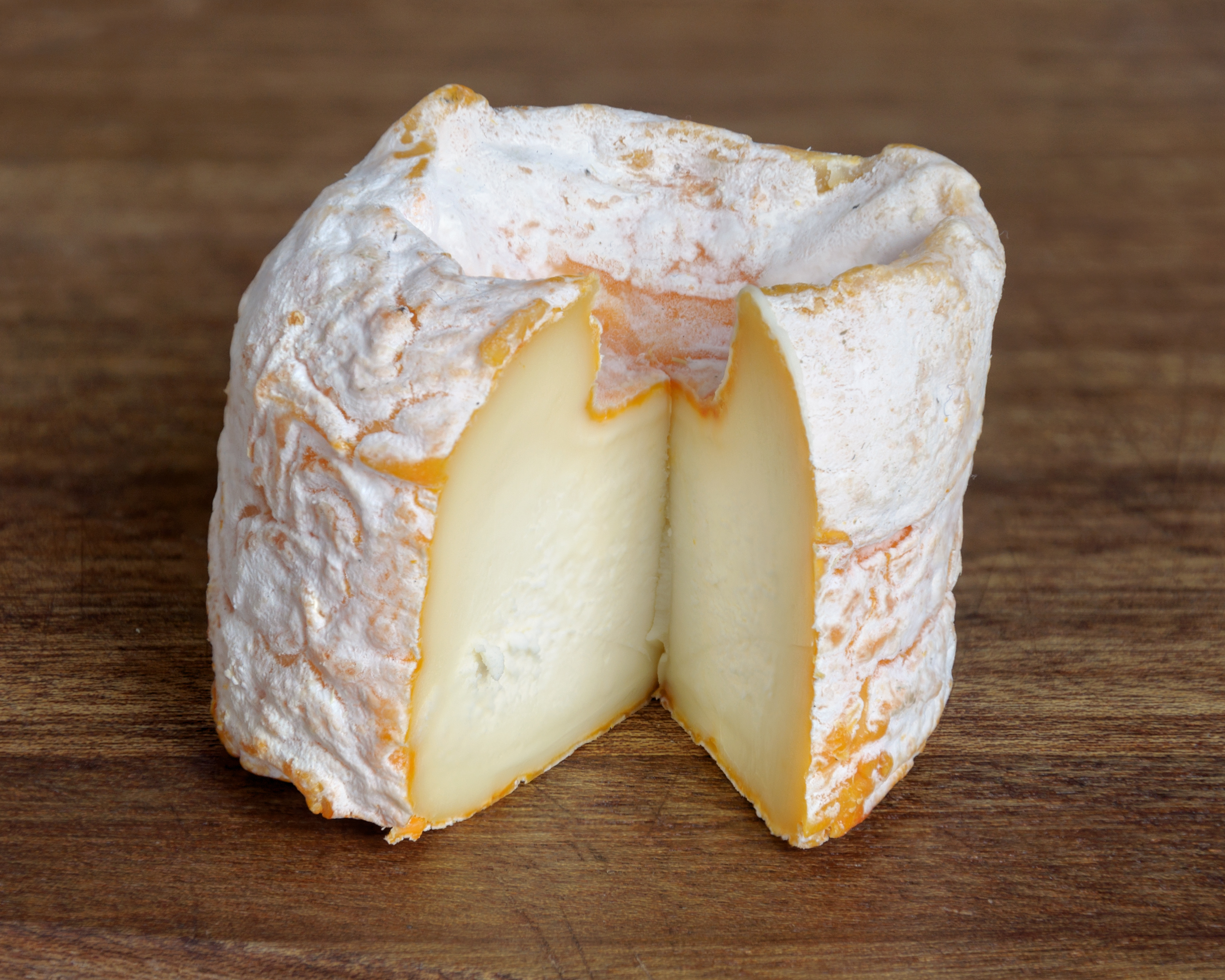
- Country of origin: France
- Region, town: Champagne-Ardenne, Langres
- Source of milk: Cows
- Pasteurised: No
- Texture: Soft, washed rind
- Aging time: at least 5 weeks
- Certification: French AOC 1991

Langres (French pronunciation: [lɑ̃ɡʁ]) is a French cheese from the plateau of Langres in the region of Champagne-Ardenne. It has benefited from an Appellation d'origine contrôlée (AOC) since 1991.

Langres is a cow's milk cheese, cylindrical in shape, weighing about 180 g. The central pâte is soft, creamy in colour, and slightly crumbly, and is surrounded by a white Penicillium candidum rind. Langres cheese is known for its vibrant orange rind, achieved through the use of annatto, and its concave dent known as the "fontaine." It is a less pungent cheese than Époisses, its local competition. It is best eaten between May and August after 5 weeks of aging, but it is also excellent March through December.

Production in 1998 was around 305 tons, a decline of 1.61% since 1996, and 2% on farms. In 2016, 605.5 tonnes of Langres cheese were produced by three dairies, including one farm producer.

== Production ==
The specifications for this Appellation d'origine contrôlée (AOC), recognized since 1991, were approved by Decree No. 2009-49 of January 13, 2009, published in the Journal Officiel on January 15, 2009.

The specifications define an AOC area covering two districts of Haute-Marne (Chaumont and Langres), one canton in the Vosges (Neufchâteau), and four villages in Côte-d'Or. The authorized cow breeds are French Simmental, Montbéliarde, and Brown Swiss. Prim'Holstein cattle are tolerated as long as they do not exceed 50% of the herd. The specifications also state that cows must graze for a minimum of six months per year.

== See also ==
- List of cheeses
