= Aristolochene =

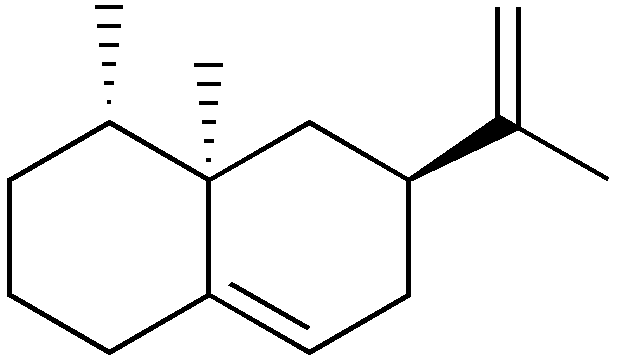

Names
- IUPAC name 7α-Eremophila-9,11-diene
- Systematic IUPAC name (4S,4aR,6S)-4,4a-Dimethyl-6-(prop-1-en-2-yl)-1,2,3,4,4a,5,6,7-octahydronaphthalene
- Other names (+)-Aristolochene

Identifiers
CAS Number	123408-96-8
3D model (JSmol)	Interactive image
ChEBI	CHEBI:43445
ChemSpider	570881
PubChem CID	656496
UNII	459BG6ZY5H
CompTox Dashboard (EPA)	DTXSID90349637
- InChI: InChI=1S/C15H24/c1-11(2)13-8-9-14-7-5-6-12(3)15(14,4)10-13/h9,12-13H,1,5-8,10H2,2-4H3/t12-,13-,15+/m0/s1 Key: YONHOSLUBQJXPR-KCQAQPDRSA-N; InChI=1/C15H24/c1-11(2)13-8-9-14-7-5-6-12(3)15(14,4)10-13/h9,12-13H,1,5-8,10H2,2-4H3/t12-,13-,15+/m0/s1 Key: YONHOSLUBQJXPR-KCQAQPDRBL
- SMILES: C[C@H]1CCCC2=CC[C@@H](C[C@]12C)C(=C)C

Properties
Chemical formula	C_{15}H_{24}
Molar mass	204.357 g·mol^{−1}
Density	0.894 g/mL
- Except where otherwise noted, data are given for materials in their standard state (at 25 °C [77 °F], 100 kPa). verify (what is ?) Infobox references

Aristolochene is a bicyclic sesquiterpene produced by certain fungi, most notably the cheese mold Penicillium roqueforti. It is biosynthesized from farnesyl pyrophosphate by the enzyme aristolochene synthase and serves as the parent hydrocarbon for a variety of fungal toxins.

== Discovery ==
Aristolochene was first isolated and structurally characterized in 1969 from the roots of Aristolochia indica by Govindachari, Mohamed, and Parthasarathy. However, this discovery involved the (−)-enantiomeric form, not the bioactive (+)-enantiomer characteristic of fungal biosynthetic pathways. The (+)-enantiomer was later identified and experimentally confirmed in Penicillium roqueforti through studies centered around aristolochene synthase activity and the ari1 locus which encodes the enzyme.

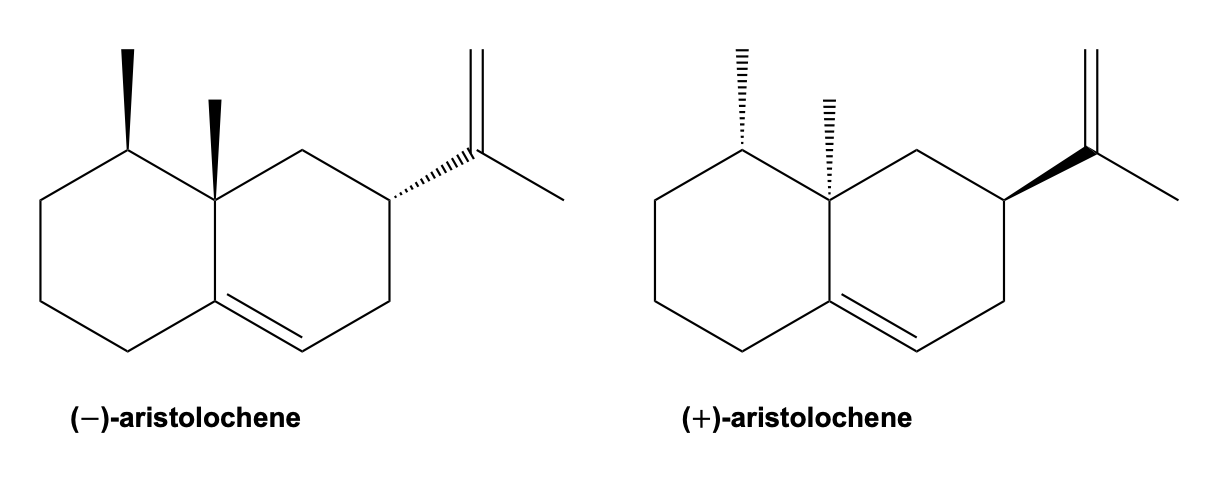
Aristolochene enantiomers

== Applications ==
Aristolochene is primarily recognized as the precursor to PR toxin, a mycotoxin produced in large quantities by Penicillium roqueforti. PR toxin has been implicated in incidents of mycotoxicoses resulting from consumption of contaminated grains; moreover, strains of Penicillium roqueforti are frequently used in commercial blue cheese production. Common blue cheese products include, Roquefort, Danish Blue, Stilton cheese, and Gorgonzola.

In addition to PR toxin, aristolochene is a biosynthetic precursor to eremofortins (A-C), a group of metabolites that function as canonical upstream intermediates in the PR toxin biosynthetic pathway. Variation in their expression can influence host-organism metabolism and modulate interactions with the surrounding environment.

The influence of aristolochene on fungal metabolic regulation is an evolving area of research. Its role as an upstream precursor has relevance towards food safety, natural product chemistry, and pharmaceutical development.

== Biosynthesis and enzymatic mechanism ==
The natural biosynthetic pathway of aristolochene in Penicillium roqueforti begins with farnesyl pyrophosphate, a 15-C substrate. Aristolochene synthase catalyzes two sequential cyclization steps in this reaction and is considered the rate-limiting enzyme in both this pathway and the downstream production of PR toxin. The enzyme active site of aristolochene synthase features highly conserved aspartate residues which chelate three divalent Mg²⁺ metal ions per reaction. These metal ions serve two key functions: (1) they coordinate with the pyrophosphate moiety of farnesyl pyrophosphate via Lewis acid-base interactions (2) they establish and maintain the necessary electrostatic environment for carbocation formation within the active site.

Enzyme Catalyzed Cyclization of Farnesyl Pyrophosphate to Aristolochene

Upon ionization and loss of the pyrophosphate leaving group, a cationic polyene cyclization reaction is favored and proceeds with configurational inversion at C-15 followed by an intramolecular ring closure to form the 10-membered sesquiterpene hydrocarbon, germacrene A.

Subsequent protonation of germacrene A at C-1 of the double bond favors intramolecular electrophilic attack from C-5 of the double bond between C-4 and C-5 onto the C-10 tertiary carbocation to form a dual six-membered ring eudesmane cation. After this stereoselective cyclization, a series of hydride shifts along with a single 1,2-rearrangement forms the stable enantioselective (+)-aristolochene product. A proposed barbed-arrow mechanism for aristolochene synthase's mechanism is depicted above.

== Related compounds ==
- Roquefortine C
- Aflatoxin
- Patulin
