= Fourme de Montbrison =

French cheese

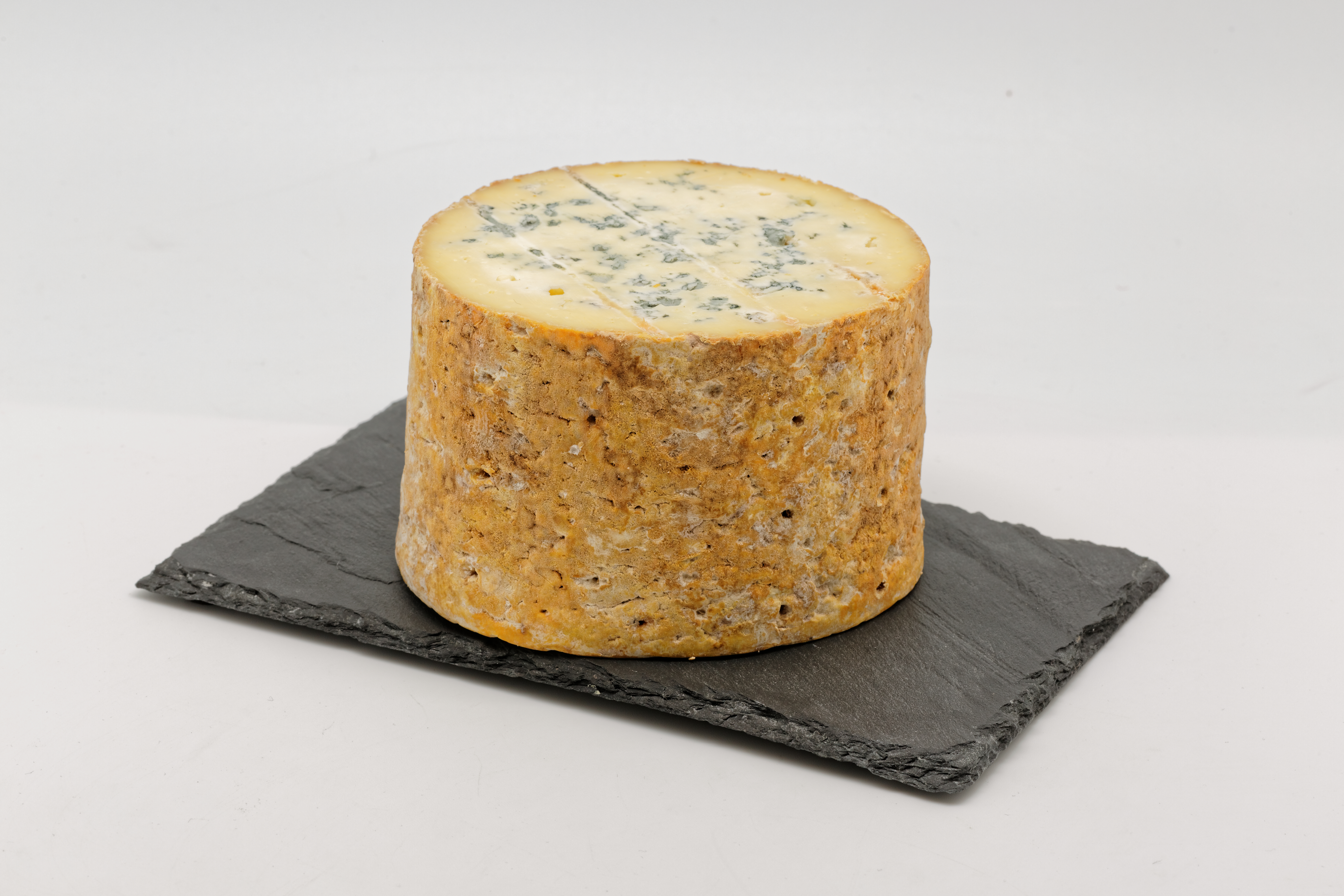
- Country of origin: France
- Region, town: Montbrison
- Source of milk: Cows
- Pasteurised: Yes (coopérative); no (artisanal)
- Texture: Blue cheese
- Aging time: 4-8 weeks
- Certification: French AOC 1972, EU PDO 2010
- Named after: Montbrison

Fourme de Montbrison (French pronunciation: [fuʁm də mɔ̃bʁizɔ̃]; Arpitan: Fôrma de Montbréson) is a cow's-milk cheese made in the regions of Rhône-Alpes and Auvergne in southern France. It derives its name from the town of Montbrison in the Loire department.

The word fourme is derived from the Latin word forma meaning "shape", the same root from which the French word fromage is believed to have been derived.

The cheese is manufactured in tall cylindrical blocks weighing between 1.5 and 2 kg (3.3 and 4.4 lb). The blocks are 13 centimetres in diameter and 19 centimetres tall, although the cheese is most frequently sold in shops in much shorter cylindrical slices.

Fourme de Montbrison has a characteristic orange-brown rind with a creamy-coloured pâte, speckled with gentle streaks of blue mould. Its Appellation d'Origine Contrôlée status was granted in 1972 under a joint decree with Fourme d'Ambert, a similar blue cheese also from the same region. In 2002 the two cheeses received AOC status in their own right, recognizing the differences in their manufacture.

With a musty scent, the cheese is extremely mild for a blue cheese and has a dry taste.

== Manufacture ==
The curd is salted and placed into a mould before being removed and placed on racks made from spruce wood. The cheese is then turned by hand, ninety degrees at a time, over a period of twelve hours. The cheese is injected with penicillium roqueforti spores, and later injected with air to form pockets in the pâte to encourage spore development.

The cheese must be aged for at least 28 days, though more often it is left for around 8 weeks. Around 20–25 L (4.4–5.5 imp gal; 5.3–6.6 US gal) of milk are used to make each cheese. By regulation the cheese may only be manufactured in any of 33 communes of the Forez mountains in the departments of Puy-de-Dôme and Loire.

The finished cheese is a minimum of 50% fat, and although the majority of production uses pasteurised milk, the growing artisanal manufacturers are using unpasteurized milk. The total production in 2005 was 495 tons.

== See also ==
- Fourme d'Ambert
- Bleu de Gex
- List of cheeses
