= Fourme d'Ambert =

Semi-hard French blue cheese

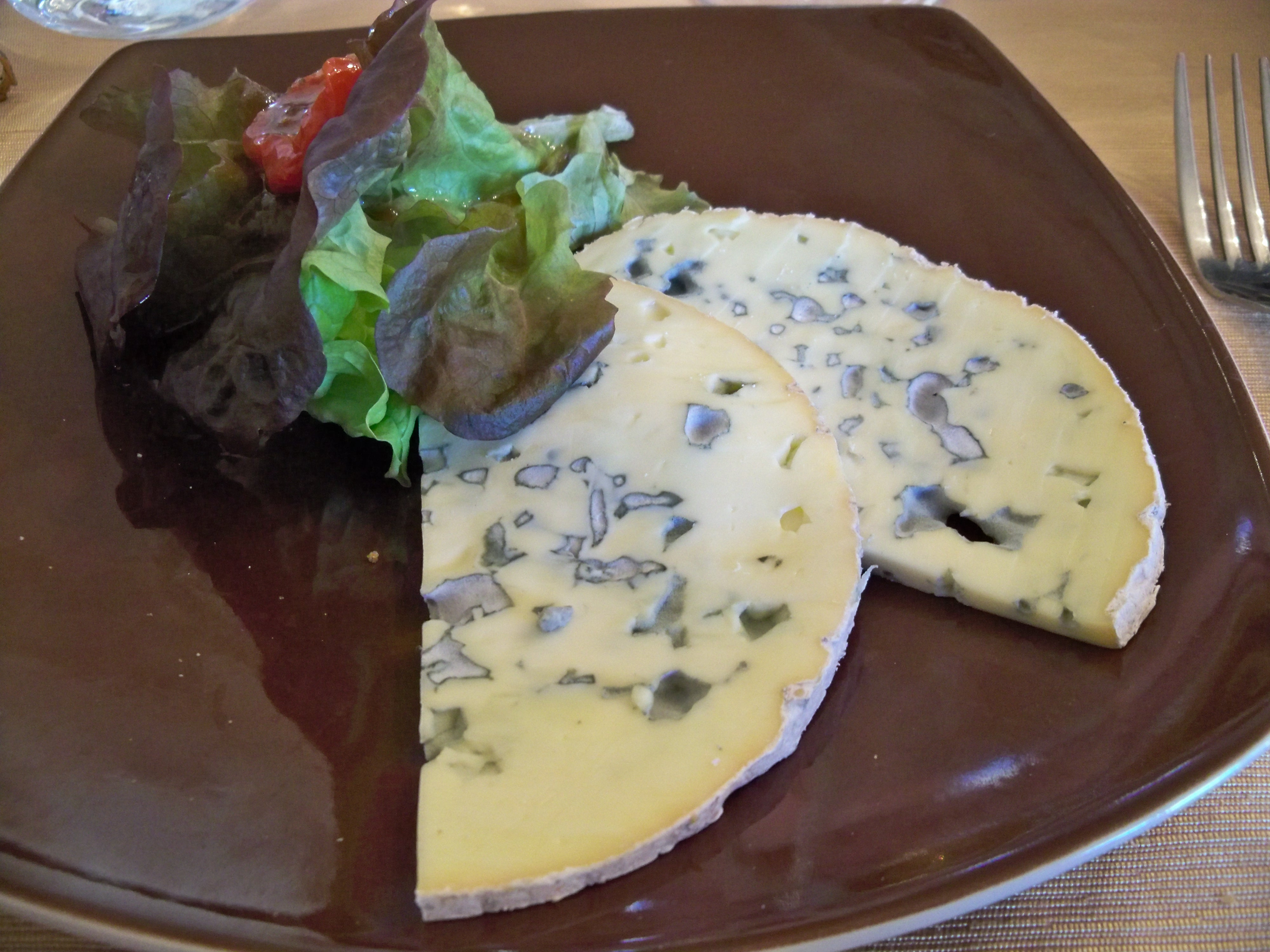
- Country of origin: France
- Region: (Puy-de-Dôme), Auvergne
- Town: Ambert
- Source of milk: Cow
- Pasteurized: Depends on variety
- Texture: Semi-hard
- Aging time: 1-4 Months
- Certification: AOC 2002, PDO 1996; With Fourme de Montbrison since 1972
- Named after: Ambert

Fourme d'Ambert (French pronunciation: [fuʁm dɑ̃bɛʁ]; Auvergnat: Forma d'Embèrt) is a semi-hard French blue cheese. One of France's oldest cheeses, it dates from as far back as Roman times. It is made from raw cow's milk from the Auvergne region of France, with a distinct, narrow cylindrical shape.

The semi-hard cheese is inoculated with Penicillium roqueforti spores and aged for at least 28 days.

Almost identical to Fourme de Montbrison, the two were protected by the same AOC from 1972 until 2002 when each was recognized as its own cheese with slight differences in manufacture. A likeness of the cheese can be found sculpted above the entrance to a medieval chapel in La Chaulme, Puy-de-Dôme.

Although most often produced with pasteurized milk by industry and Coopératives, more recently artisanal production has begun using raw milk, and farm or fermier production has now restarted. Currently, four farmers produce annually up to 35 tonnes (38.58 tons) of fourme d'Ambert fermière AOP made with raw milk.

== See also ==
- List of cheeses
