= Penicillium megasporum =

Scientific classification
- Kingdom: Fungi
- Division: Ascomycota
- Class: Eurotiomycetes
- Order: Eurotiales
- Family: Aspergillaceae
- Genus: Penicillium
- Species: P. megasporum

Binomial name
- Penicillium megasporum Orpurt, P.A.; Fennell, D.I. 1955

Type strain
- ATCC 12322, B-13, CBS 256.55, CMI 216904, FRR 2232, IMI 216904, KCTC 6275, MUCL 38804, NRRL 2232, NRRL A-3061, QM 6879, WB 2232

Synonyms
- Penicillium echinosporum, Penicillium resinae

Species of fungus

Penicillium megasporum is an anamorph species of the genus of Penicillium which produces megasporizine, phyllostine, asperphenamate and physcion.
