= Fungisporin =

Names
- IUPAC name (3S,6R,9S,12R)-3,6-Dibenzyl-9,12-di(propan-2-yl)-1,4,7,10-tetrazacyclododecane-2,5,8,11-tetrone

Identifiers
CAS Number	24181-12-2
3D model (JSmol)	Interactive image
ChemSpider	62972065
PubChem CID	102067229
- InChI: InChI=OWKLJRMFTXDULF-NAVOZUGXSA-N Key: 1S/C28H36N4O4/c1-17(2)23-27(35)30-21(15-19-11-7-5-8-12-19)25(33)29-22(16-20-13-9-6-10-14-20)26(34)31-24(18(3)4)28(36)32-23/h5-14,17-18,21-24H,15-16H2,1-4H3,(H,29,33)(H,30,35)(H,31,34)(H,32,36)/t21-,22+,23+,24-/m1/s1
- SMILES: CC(C)[C@@H]1C(=O)N[C@H](C(=O)N[C@@H](C(=O)N[C@H](C(=O)N1)CC2=CC=CC=C2)CC3=CC=CC=C3)C(C)C

Properties
Chemical formula	C_{28}H_{36}N_{4}O_{4}
Molar mass	492.620 g·mol^{−1}
- Except where otherwise noted, data are given for materials in their standard state (at 25 °C [77 °F], 100 kPa). Infobox references

Fungisporin is an antibiotic with the molecular formula C_{28}H_{36}N_{4}O_{4} which is produced by Aspergillus and Penicillium species. The cyclic peptide is a tetramer, consisting of one each of the two enantiomeric forms of phenylalanine and of valine.
