= Barceloneic acid B =

Names
- Preferred IUPAC name 2-(2-Carboxy-3-hydroxy-5-methylphenoxy)-3-hydroxy-5-methoxybenzoic acid

Identifiers
CAS Number	167875-41-4
3D model (JSmol)	Interactive image
ChemSpider	8580060
PubChem CID	10404622
UNII	Y5F92XBQ7Y
CompTox Dashboard (EPA)	DTXSID40439416
- InChI: InChI=1S/C16H14O8/c1-7-3-10(17)13(16(21)22)12(4-7)24-14-9(15(19)20)5-8(23-2)6-11(14)18/h3-6,17-18H,1-2H3,(H,19,20)(H,21,22) Key: BMKJMWKTRHWAPN-UHFFFAOYSA-N; InChI=1/C16H14O8/c1-7-3-10(17)13(16(21)22)12(4-7)24-14-9(15(19)20)5-8(23-2)6-11(14)18/h3-6,17-18H,1-2H3,(H,19,20)(H,21,22) Key: BMKJMWKTRHWAPN-UHFFFAOYAQ
- SMILES: CC1=CC(=C(C(=C1)OC2=C(C=C(C=C2O)OC)C(=O)O)C(=O)O)O

Properties
Chemical formula	C_{16}H_{14}O_{8}
Molar mass	334.280 g·mol^{−1}
- Except where otherwise noted, data are given for materials in their standard state (at 25 °C [77 °F], 100 kPa). Infobox references

Barceloneic acid B is a cytotoxic isolate of Penicillium albocoremium.
