= Penicillium giganteum =

Scientific classification
- Kingdom: Fungi
- Division: Ascomycota
- Class: Eurotiomycetes
- Order: Eurotiales
- Family: Aspergillaceae
- Genus: Penicillium
- Species: P. giganteum

Binomial name
- Penicillium giganteum Roy, R.Y.; Singh, G.N. 1968

Type strain
- ATCC 48996, CBS 144.69, FRR 0535, IMI 132774

Species of fungus

Penicillium giganteum is a species of the genus of Penicillium which was isolated from soil.
