= Austrocortirubin =

Names
- Preferred IUPAC name (5S,7S)-5,7,9,10-Tetrahydroxy-2-methoxy-7-methyl-5,6,7,8-tetrahydroanthracene-1,4-dione

Identifiers
CAS Number	97400-69-6
3D model (JSmol)	Interactive image
ChemSpider	9384461
PubChem CID	11209399
- InChI: InChI=1S/C16H16O7/c1-16(22)4-6-10(8(18)5-16)15(21)11-7(17)3-9(23-2)14(20)12(11)13(6)19/h3,8,18-19,21-22H,4-5H2,1-2H3/t8-,16-/m0/s1 Key: WWTHHBSODPGTAK-PWJLMRLQSA-N; InChI=1/C16H16O7/c1-16(22)4-6-10(8(18)5-16)15(21)11-7(17)3-9(23-2)14(20)12(11)13(6)19/h3,8,18-19,21-22H,4-5H2,1-2H3/t8-,16-/m0/s1 Key: WWTHHBSODPGTAK-PWJLMRLQBI
- SMILES: C[C@]1(C[C@@H](C2=C(C3=C(C(=C2C1)O)C(=O)C(=CC3=O)OC)O)O)O

Properties
Chemical formula	C_{16}H_{16}O_{7}
Molar mass	320.297 g·mol^{−1}
- Except where otherwise noted, data are given for materials in their standard state (at 25 °C [77 °F], 100 kPa). Infobox references

Austrocortirubin is an antibacterial metabolite found in the Dermocybe splendida mushroom.
