= Meleagrin =

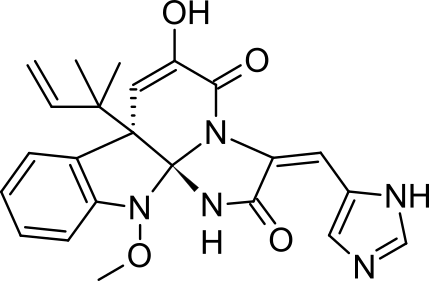

Identifiers
CAS Number	71751-77-4
3D model (JSmol)	Interactive image
ChEBI	CHEBI:70399
ChemSpider	23510990
PubChem CID	115080
UNII	5780K492K3
CompTox Dashboard (EPA)	DTXSID80891812
- InChI: InChI=1S/C23H23N5O4/c1-5-21(2,3)22-11-18(29)20(31)27-17(10-14-12-24-13-25-14)19(30)26-23(22,27)28(32-4)16-9-7-6-8-15(16)22/h5-13,29H,1H2,2-4H3,(H,24,25)(H,26,30)/b17-10+/t22-,23-/m0/s1 Key: JTJJJLSLKZFEPJ-ZAYCRUKZSA-N; InChI=1/C23H23N5O4/c1-5-21(2,3)22-11-18(29)20(31)27-17(10-14-12-24-13-25-14)19(30)26-23(22,27)28(32-4)16-9-7-6-8-15(16)22/h5-13,29H,1H2,2-4H3,(H,24,25)(H,26,30)/b17-10+/t22-,23-/m0/s1 Key: JTJJJLSLKZFEPJ-ZAYCRUKZBE
- SMILES: CC(C)(C=C)[C@@]12C=C(C(=O)N\3[C@]1(NC(=O)/C3=C\c4c[nH]cn4)N(c5c2cccc5)OC)O

Properties
Chemical formula	C_{23}H_{23}N_{5}O_{4}
Molar mass	433.468 g·mol^{−1}
- Except where otherwise noted, data are given for materials in their standard state (at 25 °C [77 °F], 100 kPa). Infobox references

Meleagrin and its derivatives such as oxaline are bio-active benzylisoquinoline alkaloids made by various species of Penicillium fungi. It is similar to other fungal alkaloids, such as Roquefortine C, which is made as an intermediate in the same biosynthetic pathway.

It was suggested to have inhibitory activity on fatty acid synthesis for the bacteria Staphylococcus aureus and Streptococcus pneumoniae.

== Biosynthesis ==
The biosynthetic pathway was determined to contain several genes, including a non-ribosomal peptide synthetase. The biosynthesis begins by cyclizing the two amino acids histidine and tryptophan, and is the followed by the addition of an isoprene, and several ring rearrangement steps.
