= Penicillium paneum =

Scientific classification
- Kingdom: Fungi
- Division: Ascomycota
- Class: Eurotiomycetes
- Order: Eurotiales
- Family: Aspergillaceae
- Genus: Penicillium
- Species: P. paneum

Binomial name
- Penicillium paneum Frisvad 1996

Type strain
- CBS 101032, CBS 302.97, IBT 12.407, IBT 12407, IBT 21541, IHEM 6652, MUCL 40611

Species of fungus

Penicillium paneum is a species of fungus in the genus Penicillium which can spoil cereal grains. Penicillium paneum produces 1-Octen-3-ol and penipanoid A, penipanoid B, penipanoid C, patulin and roquefortine C
