= Aristolochene synthase =

Class of enzymes

aristolochene synthase

Identifiers
- EC no.: 4.2.3.9

Databases
- IntEnz: IntEnz view
- BRENDA: BRENDA entry
- ExPASy: NiceZyme view
- KEGG: KEGG entry
- MetaCyc: metabolic pathway
- PRIAM: profile
- PDB structures: RCSB PDB PDBe PDBsum
- Gene Ontology: AmiGO / QuickGO
Search
- PMC: articles
- PubMed: articles
- NCBI: proteins

The enzyme aristolochene synthase (EC 4.2.3.9) catalyzes the chemical reaction

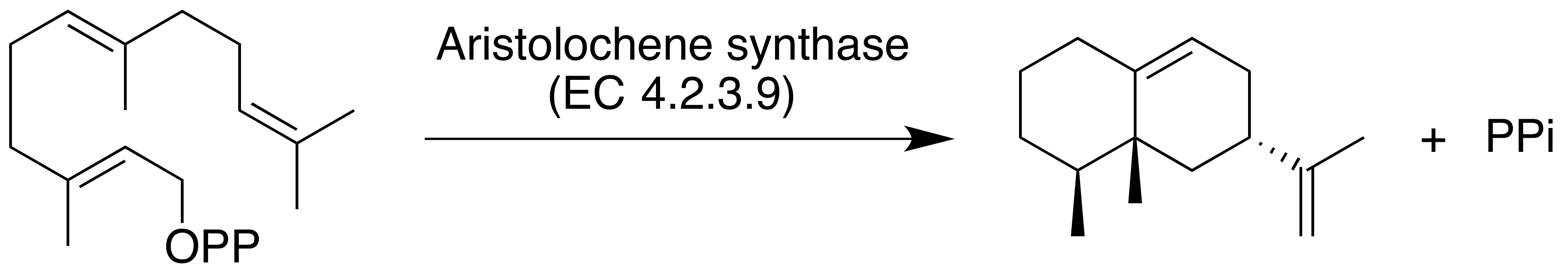

(2E,6E)-farnesyl diphosphate ⇌ (+)-aristolochene + diphosphate

This enzyme belongs to the family of lyases, specifically those carbon-oxygen lyases acting on phosphates. The systematic name of this enzyme class is (2E,6E)-farnesyl-diphosphate diphosphate-lyase (cyclizing, aristolochene-forming). Other names in common use include sesquiterpene cyclase, trans, trans-farnesyl diphosphate aristolochene-lyase, trans, trans-farnesyl-diphosphate diphosphate-lyase (cyclizing and aristolochene-forming). This enzyme participates in terpenoid biosynthesis.

This protein may use the morpheein model of allosteric regulation.

== Structural studies ==
As of late 2007, two structures have been solved for this class of enzymes, with PDB accession codes PDB: 2E4O and PDB: 2OA6. They are both notable for the very high helix content of the structure.
