= Andrastin A =

Names
- IUPAC name (3S,5R,8S,9R,10S,13R,14R)-methyl 3-acetoxy-10-formyl-4,4,8,12,13,16-hexamethyl-15,17-dioxo-2,3,4,5,6,7,8,9,10,13,14,15,16,17-tetradecahydro-1H-cyclopenta[a]phenanthrene-14-carboxylate

Identifiers
CAS Number	174232-42-9
3D model (JSmol)	Interactive image
ChEBI	CHEBI:142842
ChemSpider	5144616
PubChem CID	6712564
UNII	VL8DJU4GFD
CompTox Dashboard (EPA)	DTXSID70938482
- InChI: InChI=1S/C28H38O7/c1-15-13-19-25(6,28(23(33)34-8)22(32)16(2)21(31)26(15,28)7)11-9-18-24(4,5)20(35-17(3)30)10-12-27(18,19)14-29/h13-14,16,18-20H,9-12H2,1-8H3/t16?,18-,19-,20+,25+,26+,27+,28-/m1/s1 Key: GRBXNADBNJGZRK-GJEDHNSHSA-N
- SMILES: CC1C([C@]2(C)C(C)=C[C@]3([H])[C@@](CC[C@@]4([H])[C@@]3(C=O)CC[C@H](OC(C)=O)C4(C)C)(C)[C@]2(C(OC)=O)C1=O)=O

Properties
Chemical formula	C_{28}H_{38}O_{7}
Molar mass	486.605 g·mol^{−1}
- Except where otherwise noted, data are given for materials in their standard state (at 25 °C [77 °F], 100 kPa). Infobox references

Andrastin A is a farnesyltransferase inhibitor isolate of Penicillium species including Penicillium albocoremium and Penicillium roqueforti. It has been produced bio-synthetically by porting the relevant gene sequence into Aspergillus oryzae.

== See also ==
- Satoshi Ōmura
