= Barceloneic acid A =

Names
- Preferred IUPAC name 2-Hydroxy-6-[2-hydroxy-6-(hydroxymethyl)-4-methoxyphenoxy]-4-methylbenzoic acid

Identifiers
CAS Number	167875-40-3
3D model (JSmol)	Interactive image
ChEMBL	ChEMBL512938
ChemSpider	8534074
PubChem CID	10358625
CompTox Dashboard (EPA)	DTXSID901045458
- InChI: InChI=1S/C16H16O7/c1-8-3-11(18)14(16(20)21)13(4-8)23-15-9(7-17)5-10(22-2)6-12(15)19/h3-6,17-19H,7H2,1-2H3,(H,20,21) Key: ULPVIBVOKQAXJB-UHFFFAOYSA-N; InChI=1/C16H16O7/c1-8-3-11(18)14(16(20)21)13(4-8)23-15-9(7-17)5-10(22-2)6-12(15)19/h3-6,17-19H,7H2,1-2H3,(H,20,21) Key: ULPVIBVOKQAXJB-UHFFFAOYAL
- SMILES: CC1=CC(=C(C(=C1)OC2=C(C=C(C=C2CO)OC)O)C(=O)O)O

Properties
Chemical formula	C_{16}H_{16}O_{7}
Molar mass	320.294
- Except where otherwise noted, data are given for materials in their standard state (at 25 °C [77 °F], 100 kPa). Infobox references

Barceloneic acid A is a farnesyl transferase inhibitor isolate of Phoma.
