= Oxaline =

Identifiers
CAS Number	55623-37-5
3D model (JSmol)	Interactive image
ChEBI	CHEBI:70400
ChemSpider	10225680
PubChem CID	6438440
CompTox Dashboard (EPA)	DTXSID60893990
- InChI: InChI=1S/C24H25N5O4/c1-6-22(2,3)23-12-19(32-4)21(31)28-18(11-15-13-25-14-26-15)20(30)27-24(23,28)29(33-5)17-10-8-7-9-16(17)23/h6-14H,1H2,2-5H3,(H,25,26)(H,27,30)/b18-11+/t23-,24-/m1/s1 Key: SOHAVULMGIITDH-SSDCDQDPSA-N; InChI=1/C24H25N5O4/c1-6-22(2,3)23-12-19(32-4)21(31)28-18(11-15-13-25-14-26-15)20(30)27-24(23,28)29(33-5)17-10-8-7-9-16(17)23/h6-14H,1H2,2-5H3,(H,25,26)(H,27,30)/b18-11+/t23-,24-/m1/s1 Key: SOHAVULMGIITDH-SSDCDQDPBU
- SMILES: CC(C)(C=C)[C@]12C=C(C(=O)N\3[C@@]1(NC(=O)/C3=C\c4c[nH]cn4)N(c5c2cccc5)OC)OC

Properties
Chemical formula	C_{24}H_{25}N_{5}O_{4}
Molar mass	447.495 g·mol^{−1}
- Except where otherwise noted, data are given for materials in their standard state (at 25 °C [77 °F], 100 kPa). Infobox references

Oxaline is a fungal isolate with anticancer activity in vitro. It is an O-methylated derivative of meleagrin.
