= Penitrem A =

Names
- Other names Tremortin

Identifiers
CAS Number	12627-35-9
3D model (JSmol)	Interactive image
ChemSpider	298950
ECHA InfoCard	100.162.141
PubChem CID	337313
UNII	244AU85PR7
CompTox Dashboard (EPA)	DTXSID00320093
- InChI: InChI=1S/C37H44ClNO6/c1-15(2)28-27(40)31-37(45-31)23(43-28)9-10-33(6)34(7)18(8-11-35(33,37)41)29-25-24-21(39-30(25)34)14-20(38)17-12-16(3)19-13-22(32(4,5)44-29)36(19,42)26(17)24/h14,18-19,22-23,27-29,31,39-42H,1,3,8-13H2,2,4-7H3/t18-,19+,22+,23-,27-,28+,29-,31-,33+,34+,35-,36?,37+/m0/s1 Key: JDUWHZOLEDOQSR-JHMXYHNCSA-N
- SMILES: CC(=C)C1C(C2C3(O2)C(O1)CCC4(C3(CCC5C4(C6=C7C5OC(C8CC9C8(C1=C7C(=CC(=C1CC9=C)Cl)N6)O)(C)C)C)O)C)O

Properties
Chemical formula	C_{37}H_{44}ClNO_{6}
Molar mass	633.20136
- Except where otherwise noted, data are given for materials in their standard state (at 25 °C [77 °F], 100 kPa). verify (what is ?) Infobox references

Penitrem A (tremortin) is an indole-diterpenoid mycotoxin produced by certain species of Aspergillus, Claviceps, and Penicillium, which can be found growing on various plant species such as ryegrass. Penitrem A is one of many secondary metabolites following the synthesis of paxilline in Penicillium crostosum. Penitrem A poisoning in humans and animals usually occurs through the consumption of foods inhabited by penitrem producing fungi. In humans, penitrem A poisoning has been associated with severe tremors, hyperthermia, nausea/vomiting, diplopia, and bloody diarrhea. In animals, symptoms of penitrem A poisoning has been associated with symptoms ranging from tremors, seizures, and hyperthermia to ataxia and nystagmus.

Roquefortine C has been commonly detected in documented cases of penitrem A poisoning, making it a possible biomarker for diagnoses.

== Mechanism of action ==
Penitrem A impairs GABAergic amino acid neurotransmission and antagonizes high-conductance Ca^{2+}-activated potassium channels in both humans and animals. Impairment of the GABAergic amino acid neurotransmission comes with the spontaneous release of the excitatory amino acids glutamate and aspartate as well as the inhibitory neurotransmitter γ-aminobutyric acid (GABA). The sudden release of these neurotransmitters results in imbalanced GABAergic signalling, which gives rise to neurological disorders such as the tremors associated with penitrem A poisoning.

Penitrem A also induces the production of reactive oxygen species (ROS) in the neutrophil granulocytes of humans and animals. Increased ROS production results in tissue damage in the brain and other afflicted organs as well as hemorrhages in acute poisonings.

== Synthesis ==
In Penicillium crustosum, synthesis of penitrem A and other secondary metabolites follows the synthesis of paxilline. Synthesis of penitrem A involves six oxidative-transformation enzymes (four cytochrome P450 monooxygenases and two flavin adenine dinucleotide (FAD)-dependent monooxygenases), two acetyltransferases, one oxidoreductase, and one prenyltransferase. These enzymes are encoded by a cluster of genes used in paxilline synthesis and penitrem A-F synthesis. The pathway is described below:

1. Oxidoreductase catalyzes the reduction of paxilline's ketone and also adds a dimethylallyl group to its aromatic ring.
2. Acetyltransferases catalyze the removal of the intermediate's lower right-hand hydroxyl group and reduce of one of the nearby methyl groups to a methylene group.
3. Oxidative-transformation enzyme catalyzes the addition of a hydroxyl group to the intermediate's dimethylallyl group. The dimethylallyl's double bond migrates down one carbon.
4. Prenyltransferase catalyzes the formation of a dimethyl-cyclopentane and a cyclobutane using the intermediate's aromatic ring-alcohol group.
5. Oxidative-transformation enzyme catalyzes the formation of a methylenecyclohexane using the intermediate's dimethyl-cyclopentane, forming secopenitrem D.
6. Oxidative-transformation enzyme catalyzes the formation of a cyclooctane using cyclobutane's alcohol group and the carbon joining secopenitrem D's cyclohexane and cyclopentane, forming penitrem D.
7. Oxidative-transformation enzyme catalyzes the addition a chlorine atom at penitrem D's aromatic ring, forming penitrem C.
8. Oxidative-transformation enzyme catalyzes the formation of an epoxide ring at penitrem C's oxane-double bond, forming penitrem F.
9. Oxidative-transformation enzyme catalyzes the addition of a hydroxyl group at the carbon joining penitrem F's methylenecyclohexane and cyclobutane, forming penitrem A.

== See also ==
- Paxilline
- Roquefortine C
