= Cyclopiazonic acid =

Names
- Preferred IUPAC name (6aR,11aS,11bR)-10-Acetyl-11-hydroxy-7,7-dimethyl-2,6,6a,7,11a,11b-hexahydro-9H-pyrrolo[1′,2′:2,3]isoindolo[4,5,6-cd]indol-9-one

Identifiers
CAS Number	18172-33-3
3D model (JSmol)	Interactive image
Beilstein Reference	707309
ChEBI	CHEBI:22450
ChEMBL	ChEMBL480627
ChemSpider	21106432
ECHA InfoCard	100.162.058
EC Number	634-041-6
IUPHAR/BPS	5350
KEGG	C03032
PubChem CID	65261
UNII	X9TLY4580Z
CompTox Dashboard (EPA)	DTXSID00891798
- InChI: InChI=1S/C20H20N2O3/c1-9(23)14-18(24)17-16-11-8-21-13-6-4-5-10(15(11)13)7-12(16)20(2,3)22(17)19(14)25/h4-6,8,12,16-17,21,24H,7H2,1-3H3/t12-,16+,17+/m1/s1 Key: SZINUGQCTHLQAZ-DQYPLSBCSA-N; InChI=1/C20H20N2O3/c1-9(23)14-18(24)17-16-11-8-21-13-6-4-5-10(15(11)13)7-12(16)20(2,3)22(17)19(14)25/h4-6,8,12,16-17,21,24H,7H2,1-3H3/t12-,16+,17+/m1/s1 Key: SZINUGQCTHLQAZ-DQYPLSBCBO
- SMILES: CC(=O)C1=C(O)[C@H]5N(C1=O)[C@@](C)(C)[C@@H]4Cc2cccc3[nH]cc(c23)[C@@H]45

Properties
Chemical formula	C_{20}H_{20}N_{2}O_{3}
Molar mass	336.391 g·mol^{−1}
- Except where otherwise noted, data are given for materials in their standard state (at 25 °C [77 °F], 100 kPa). verify (what is ?) Infobox references

Cyclopiazonic acid (α-CPA), a mycotoxin and a fungal neurotoxin, is made by the molds Aspergillus and Penicillium. It is an indole-tetramic acid that serves as a toxin due to its ability to inhibit calcium-dependent ATPases found in the endoplasmic and sarcoplasmic reticulum. This inhibition disrupts the muscle contraction-relaxation cycle and the calcium gradient that is maintained for proper cellular activity in cells.

Cyclopiazonic acid is known to contaminate multiple foods because the molds that produce them are able to grow on different agricultural products, including but not limited to grains, corn, peanuts, and cheese. Due to this contamination, α-CPA can be harmful to both humans and farm animals that were exposed to contaminated animal feeds. However, α-CPA needs to be introduced in very high concentrations to produce mycotoxicosis in animals. Due to this, α-CPA is not considered a potent acute toxin.

Chemically, CPA is related to ergoline alkaloids. CPA was originally isolated from Penicillium cyclopium and subsequently from other fungi including Penicillium griseofulvum, Penicillium camemberti, Penicillium commune, Aspergillus flavus, and Aspergillus versicolor. CPA only appears to be toxic in high concentrations. Ingestion of CPA causes anorexia, dehydration, weight loss, immobility, and signs of spasm when near death. CPA can be found in molds, corns, peanuts, and other fermented products, such as cheese and sausages. Biologically, CPA is a specific inhibitor of SERCA ATPase in intracellular Ca^{2+} storage sites. CPA inhibits SERCA ATPase by keeping it in one specific conformation, affecting both the catalytic and transport domains of the protein. CPA also binds to SERCA ATPase at the same site as another inhibitor, thapsigargin (TG). In this way, CPA reduces the ability of SERCA ATPase to bind an ATP molecule.

== Toxicity ==
Serious cases of α-CPA mycotoxicosis in humans are rare. However, the occurrence of α-CPA in foods consumed by humans suggests that the toxin is indeed ingested by humans, though at concentrations low enough to only cause minimal health concerns. When taken in higher concentrations, humans have been seen to experience mild neurological symptoms for several days before recovering. Even if its toxicity in humans is rare, large doses of α-CPA have been seen to adversely affect animals such as mice, rats, chickens, pigs, dogs, and rabbits. Cyclopiazonic acid's toxicity mirrors that of antipsychotic drugs when taken up these animals. Dogs in particular react very strongly, with an observed LD_{50} as low as 0.5 mg/kg after repeated exposure. Mice and chickens have LD_{50}s after oral ingestion of 12 mg/kg and 36-63 mg/kg respectively. This wide range of toxicity for the poison is indicative of different levels of reliance on the sarco(endo)plasmic reticulum calcium^{2+}-ATPase pump across different species. Assuming an average LD_{50} of 20 mg/kg, it can be seen that cyclopiazonic acid is slightly more toxic than nicotine while slightly less toxic than sodium cyanide for most mammals.

While not carcinogenic itself, CPA is often found co-contaminating crops and food items alongside carcinogenic aflatoxins. It can be easy to misconstrue to the toxic effects of this toxin family with the relatively lesser toxic effects of CPA. The mycotoxin has been shown to be non-mutagenic through bacterial assays and is thus not in contention for causing cancer in the muscle cells it is most commonly found in.

=== Symptoms ===
This mycotoxin has been extensively studied in mice to discern its toxic properties. The severity of toxicity is dose-dependent, and exposure to α-CPA has led to hypokinesia, hypothermia, catalepsy, tremors, irregular respiration, ptosis, weight loss, and eventual death in mice. The adverse health effects of α-CPA studied in mice are similar to those found in other small mammals. Poisoning in other animals such as cattle has shown diminished muscle strength and mobility, with serious cases causing muscular degeneration and necrosis. These severe symptoms are only commonly seen in small mammals such as rats and birds such as chickens.

In humans, the most common symptoms affect the nervous and cardiovascular systems. These symptoms include tremors, delirium, vomiting, shaking, and bouts of unconsciousness for 1-3 days. Death is only observed in the most serious cases, which are extremely rare. It is likely that the worst symptoms only come about through the intake of both CPA and aflatoxins in a heavily contaminated source.

== Method of Exposure ==
Cyclopiazonic acid exposure is most common through the consumption of moldy foods and crops. Both Aspergillus and Penicillum molds grow on grain crops such as millet and barley, while some mold species are also found on contaminated meat, egg, and dairy substrates. This provides a relatively simple method of avoiding the toxin by being careful with food intake and avoiding obvious mold. However, this is not always possible, as evidenced by various cases of people in Uttar Pradesh, India who are inadvertently poisoned by cyclopiazonic acid after eating moldy kodo millet (Paspalum scrobiculatum). This illness after eating kodo millet is referred to as kodua poisoning, and is primarily caused by cyclopiazonic acid, as well as the aflatoxins it is associated with. Millet crops serve as the grain most prone to fungal infection during the spring and summer, resulting in a poisoned food supply for many people in North India.

Outside of the Indian subcontinent, meat and dairy products are the most likely carriers of CPA containing molds. In Europe, fermented sausages are often made with the use of Penicillium and Aspergillus mold species. Camembert cheese from Northwest France is fermented with the use of Penicillium camemberti. For Asian countries, some fermented soy sauces are made with the use of Aspergillus oryzae.

Cyclopiazonic acid is an incredibly common mycotoxin, appearing all over the globe and in food items and crops belonging to many cultures. As a product of the ubiquitous penicillium and aspergillus molds, it can be assumed that any food item or moist place capable of hosting the fungi may contain CPA. Despite all this, it is generally not a concern that requires more than standard safety practices. 20kg of moldy maize meal was purified down to only 395mg of pure cyclopiazonic acid during the original isolation of the substance, which indicates the low concentration produced under standard conditions.

== Biosynthesis ==
Three enzymes are utilized in the biosynthesis of α-CPA: the polypeptide CpaS, dimethylallyltransferase (CpaD), and flavoprotein oxidocyclase (CpaO). CpaS is the first enzyme in the biosynthetic pathway and is a hybrid polyketide synthase- nonribosomal peptide synthetase (PKS-NRPS). It uses the precursors acetyl-CoA, malonyl-CoA, and tryptophan to produce cyclo-acetoaceytl-L-tryptophan (cAATrp). The intermediate cAATrp is then prenylated with dimethylallyl pyrophosphate (DMAPP) by the enzyme CpaD to form the intermediate β-CPA. CpaD has high substrate specificity and will not catalyze prenylation in the presence of DMAPP's isomer isopentyl pyrophosphate (IPP) or the derivatives of cAATrp. The third enzyme, CpaO, then acts on β-CPA through a redox mechanism that allows for intramolecular cyclization to form α-CPA.

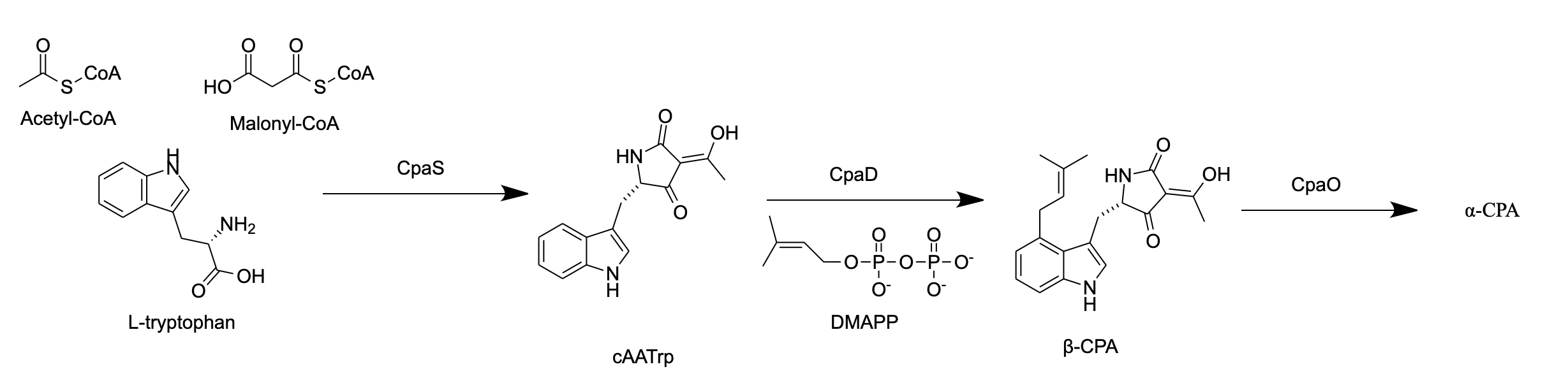
The biosynthesis of alpha-CPA involves three main enzymes.

As typical for tetramic acids and especially 3-acetyltetramic acids, cyclopiazonic acid can exist in several tautomeric forms that have internal hydrogen bonding of the enols.

=== Mechanism of action of CpaS ===
CpaS is made of several domains that belong either to the PKS portion or the NRPS portion of the 431 kDa protein. The PKS portion is made up of three catalytically important domains and three additional tailoring domains that are common to polyketide synthases but not used in the biosynthesis of α-CPA. The catalytically important acyl carrier protein domain (ACP), acyl transferase domain (AT), and ketosynthase domain (KS) work together to form acetoacetyl-CoA from the precursors acetyl-CoA and malonyl-CoA. The acetoacetyl-CoA is then acted on by the NRPS portion of CpaS. The NRPS portion, like the PKS portion, contains many catalytically active domains. The adenylation domain (A) acts first to activate the amino acid tryptophan and subsequently transfer it to the peptidyl carrier protein (PCP) domain (T). Following this, the condensation domain (C) catalyzes an amide bond formation between the acetoacetyl moiety attached to the ACP and tryptophan attached to the PCP. The releasing domain (R) catalyzes a Dieckmann condensation to both cyclize and release the cAATrp product.

=== Formation of β-CPA ===
The second enzyme, CpaD, converts the cAATrp produced by CpaS to β-CPA. CpaD, also known as cycloacetoacetyltyptophanyl dimethylallyl transferase, places DMAPP at the tryptophan indole ring, specifically at position C-4. CpaD then catalyzes selective prenylation at position C-4 through a Friedel-Craft alkylation, producing β-CPA. The biosynthesis of α-CPA is dependent on other pathways, specifically the mevalonate pathway, which serves to form DMAPP.

=== Formation of α-CPA ===
The final enzyme in the biosynthetic pathway, CpaO, converts β-CPA to α-CPA. CpaO is a FAD-dependent oxidoreductase. FAD oxidizes β-CPA in a two-electron process, subsequently allowing for ring closure and formation of α-CPA. To regenerate the oxidized FAD cofactor used by CpaO, the reduced FAD reacts with molecular oxygen to produce hydrogen peroxide.

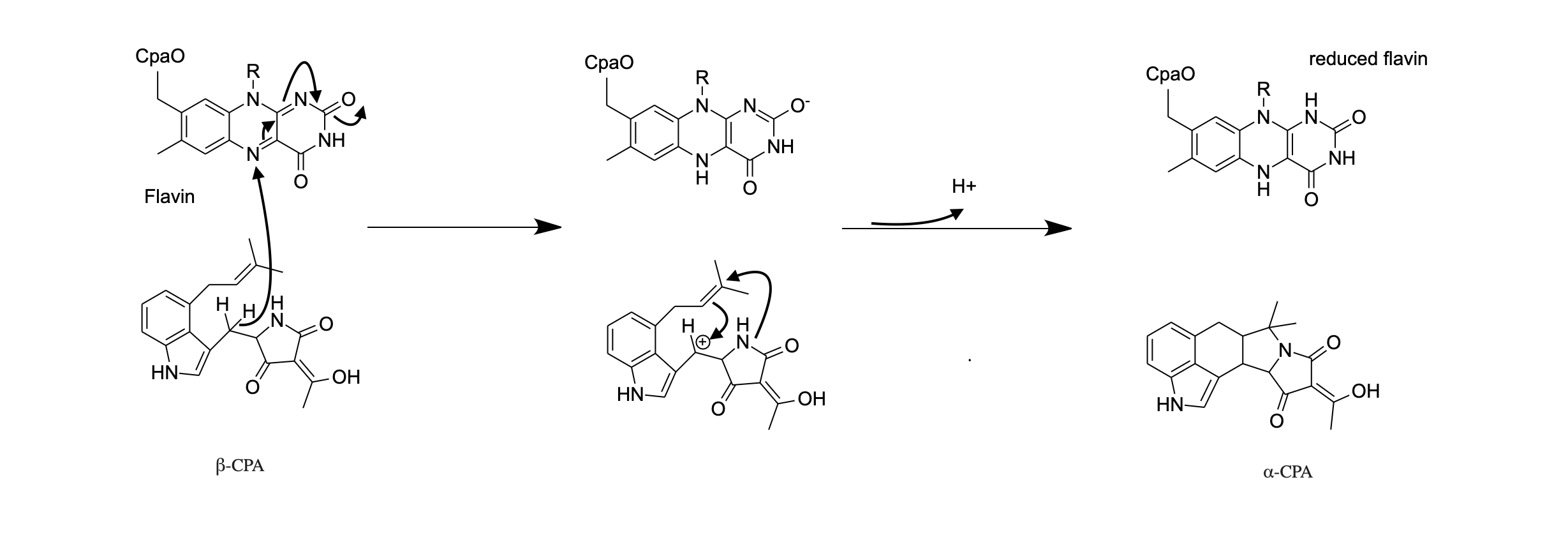
Possible cyclization mechanism to form cyclopiazonic acid.

== Biochemical effects in mammals ==
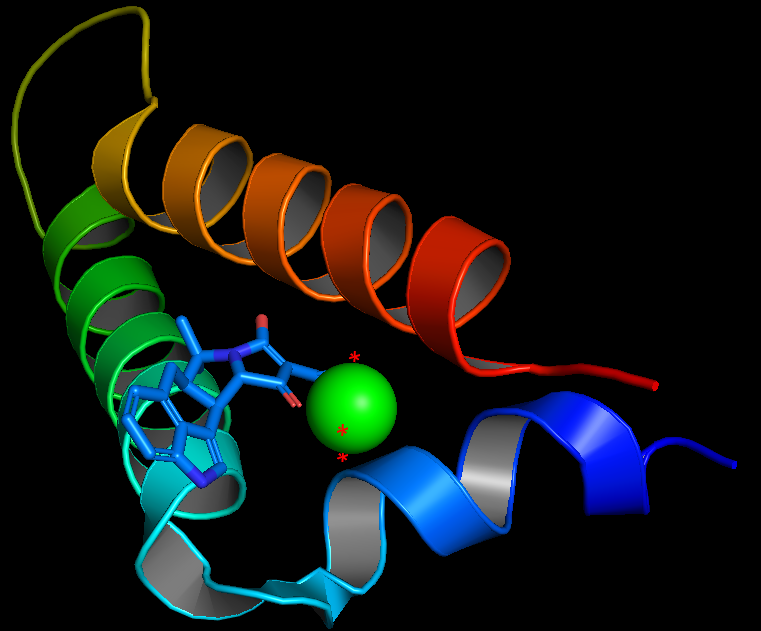
Pymol illustration of protein database structure showing cyclopiazonic acid interacting with SERCA

The sarcoplasmic/endoplasmic reticiulum Ca^{2+} ATPase, known commonly as SERCA, is a membrane-associated pump responsible for sequestering calcium into organelles from the cytosol. This important function is associated with muscle recovery and nerve recovery after excitation. CPA binding to this protein occurs through interactions with a divalent magnesium cation in the calcium access channel of SERCA. Upon binding, the protein is locked in an E2-like state where the cytoplasmic calcium binding sites on each transmembrane helix are inaccessible. This results in a buildup of calcium within the cytoplasm, depleting calcium ion stores within the cell as reuptake is inhibited. The toxic effects of cyclopiazonic acid are readily reversible, usually fading within a few days at most. However, in some cases, CPA acts to enable store-operated calcium entry(SOCE), a process in which calcium-permeable channels are activated due to inhibition of the standard SERCA pump.

The reactions with SERCA are extremely specific, indicating that the magnesium ion in the proper residue is required for any CPA binding. This is seen through the inability of CPA to inhibit other common ATPases. Sodium-potassium pumps in the kidneys and brain, as well as the gastric hydrogen-potassium pump are completely unaffected by the toxin even at concentrations as high as 1000nmol/mg of protein. Another notable biochemical aspects of cyclopiazonic acid is that the enzyme can be protected by flooding the system with ATP, as it competes with the CPA for binding. Interestingly, calcium is unable to compete in this same way, with the inhibitory effects only being decreased moderately after a large increase in free Ca^{2+}.

== History ==
Cyclopiazonic acid was originally isolated by chemist C.W. Holzapfel from a sample of Penicillium cyclopium. Holzapfel initially reported this fungus as growing on domestic cereals that were fed to ducklings and rats, with later sources detailing that it was growing on groundnuts. The acute toxicosis induced in these animals upon consumption of the mold served as a warning of the mycotoxin species found within the P. cyclopium. From there Holzapfel performed a variety of experiments related to the fungus, eventually determining that although there were other compounds present, cyclopiazonic acid was the primary cause of the fungus’ toxicity. This report on other compounds matches with CPA being commonly found alongside aflatoxins.

Despite serious CPA poisoning cases being rare in humans, the common nature of the mycotoxin has led to it being fairly well studied. Perhaps most interestingly is the use of CPA to study calcium ATPases. SERCA is a promising target for modern drug research, and the ability to lock it into certain conformations with nanomolar amounts of the toxin is therefore very useful. Crystallographic structures of SERCA bound to CPA provide some of the clearest views of the entire structure.
