= Roquefortine C =

- Chemical structure of roquefortine C

Names
- Preferred IUPAC name (3E,5aS,10bR,11aS)-3-[(1H-Imidazol-5-yl)methylidene]-10b-(2-methylbut-3-en-2-yl)-6,10b,11,11a-tetrahydro-2H-pyrazino[1′,2′:1,5]pyrrolo[2,3-b]indole-1,4(3H,5aH)-dione

Identifiers
CAS Number	58735-64-1
3D model (JSmol)	Interactive image
ChEMBL	ChEMBL517788
ChemSpider	10246629
PubChem CID	21608802
UNII	4VW6U94XFK
CompTox Dashboard (EPA)	DTXSID20891816
- InChI: InChI=1S/C22H23N5O2/c1-4-21(2,3)22-10-17-18(28)25-16(9-13-11-23-12-24-13)19(29)27(17)20(22)26-15-8-6-5-7-14(15)22/h4-9,11-12,17,20,26H,1,10H2,2-3H3,(H,23,24)(H,25,28)/b16-9+/t17-,20-,22+/m0/s1 Key: SPWSUFUPTSJWNG-JJUKSXGLSA-N; InChI=1/C22H23N5O2/c1-4-21(2,3)22-10-17-18(28)25-16(9-13-11-23-12-24-13)19(29)27(17)20(22)26-15-8-6-5-7-14(15)22/h4-9,11-12,17,20,26H,1,10H2,2-3H3,(H,23,24)(H,25,28)/b16-9+/t17-,20-,22+/m0/s1 Key: SPWSUFUPTSJWNG-JJUKSXGLBA
- SMILES: CC(C)(C=C)[C@@]12C[C@H]3C(=O)N/C(=C/c4cnc[nH]4)/C(=O)N3[C@@H]1Nc5c2cccc5

Properties
Chemical formula	C_{22}H_{23}N_{5}O_{2}
Molar mass	389.5 g/mol
Appearance	White to off-white solid
Solubility in water	Soluble in ethanol, methanol, DMF or DMSO
- Except where otherwise noted, data are given for materials in their standard state (at 25 °C [77 °F], 100 kPa). verify (what is ?) Infobox references

Roquefortine C is a mycotoxin that belongs to a class of naturally occurring 2,5-diketopiperazines produced by various fungi, particularly species from the genus Penicillium. It was first isolated from a strain of Penicillium roqueforti, a species commercially used as a source of proteolytic and lipolytic enzymes during maturation of the blue-veined cheeses, Roquefort, Danish Blue, Stilton and Gorgonzola.

Roquefortine C is a cyclodipeptide mycotoxin derived from the diketopiperazine cyclo(Trp-dehydro-His) and is a relatively common fungal metabolite produced by a number of Penicillium species. It is also considered one of the most important fungal contaminants of carbonated beverages, beer, wine, meats, cheese and bread. At high doses roquefortine C is classified as a toxic compound. Although it is a potent neurotoxin at high doses, at low concentrations of 0.05 to 1.47 mg/kg that occur in domestic cheeses, it was found to be "safe for the consumer". The mechanisms underlying its toxicity and metabolism have been investigated by studying its interaction with mammalian cytochrome P450 enzymes. In addition to these toxic properties, roquefortine C reportedly possesses bacteriostatic activity against gram-positive bacteria, but only in those organisms containing haemoproteins.

Roquefortine C contains the unusual E-dehydrohistidine moiety, a system that typically undergoes facile isomerization under acidic, basic, or photochemical conditions to isoroquefortine C, the 3,12 double-bond Z-isomer of roquefortine C.

Isomerisation of Roquefortine C to Isoroquefortine C

However isoroquefortine C is not a fungal product and in contrast to roquefortine C does not bind iron. Both have been synthesised.

== Related compounds ==
- Aristolochene
- Aflatoxin
- Patulin
