= Aspergillus qinqixianii =

Scientific classification
- Kingdom: Fungi
- Division: Ascomycota
- Class: Eurotiomycetes
- Order: Eurotiales
- Family: Aspergillaceae
- Genus: Aspergillus
- Species: A. qinqixianii

Binomial name
- Aspergillus qinqixianii Y. Horie, Abliz & R.Y. Li (2000)

Type strain
- CBS 128788 = IFM 55020 = CMB-FA-866 = DTO 098-H6

Synonyms
- Emericella qinqixianii

Species of fungus

Aspergillus qinqixianii is a species of fungus in the genus Aspergillus which has been isolated from desert soil from the Taklimakan desert in China. It is from the Nidulantes section. Aspergillus qinqixianii produces asteltoxin, asperthecin, emericellin, 2-ω-hydroxyemodin, shamixanthones, terrein, curvularin and dehydrocurvularin.

== Growth and morphology ==
A. qinqixianii has been cultivated on both Czapek yeast extract agar (CYA) plates and Malt Extract Agar Oxoid (MEAOX) plates. The growth morphology of the colonies can be seen in the pictures below.

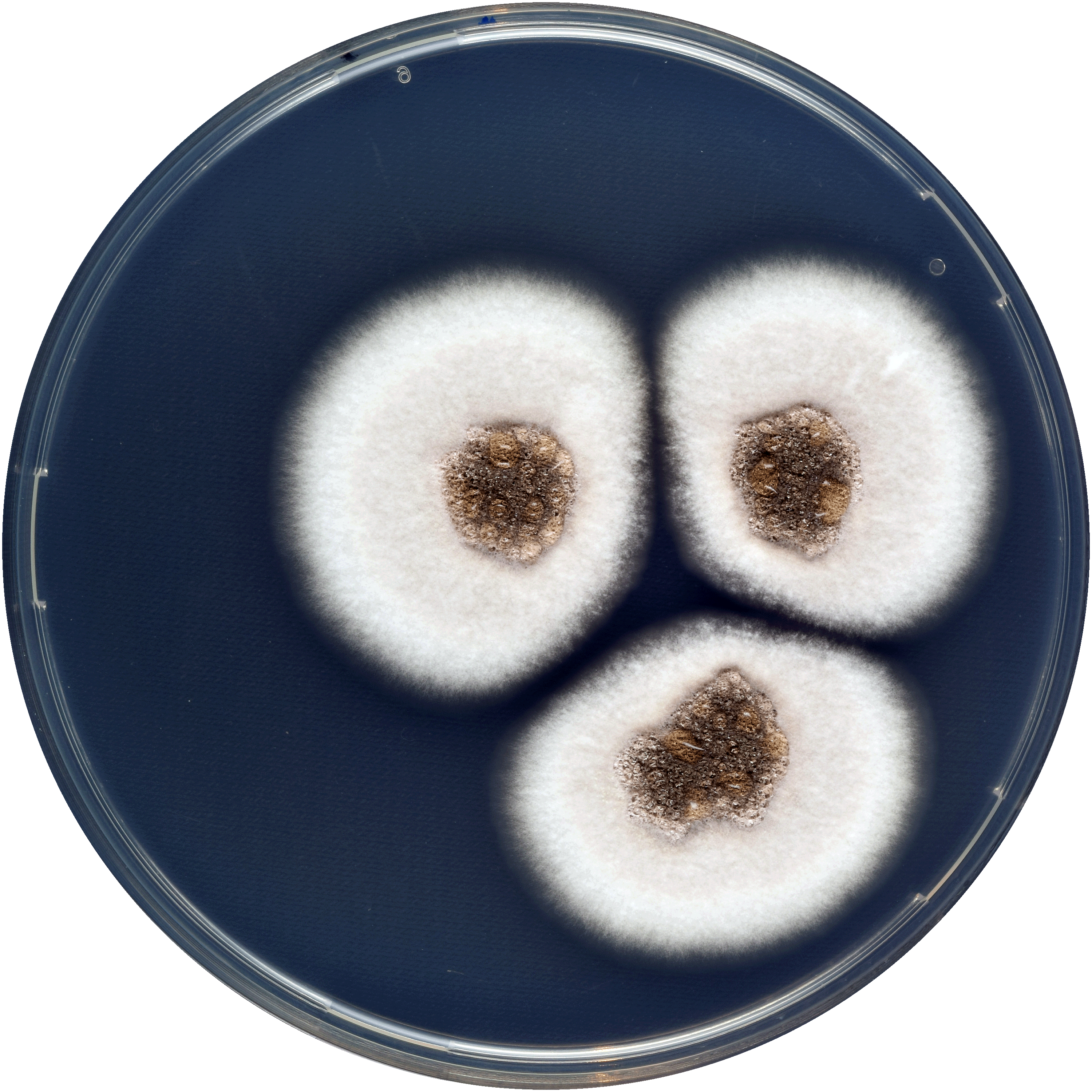
Aspergillus qinqixianii growing on CYA plate

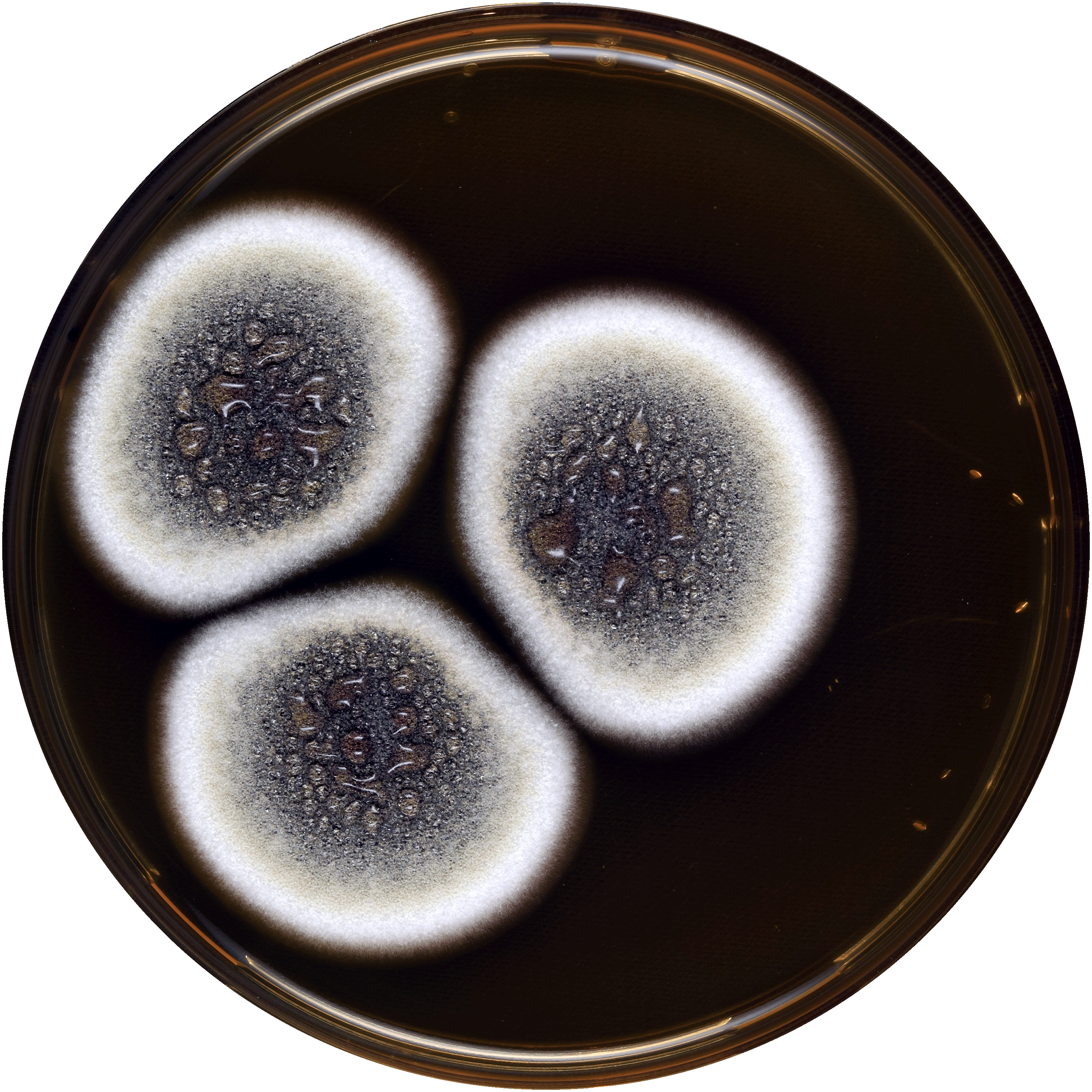
Aspergillus qinqixianii growing on MEAOX plate
