= Aspergillus luppii =

Scientific classification
- Kingdom: Fungi
- Division: Ascomycota
- Class: Eurotiomycetes
- Order: Eurotiales
- Family: Aspergillaceae
- Genus: Aspergillus
- Species: A. luppii

Binomial name
- Aspergillus luppii Luppi-Mosca, A.M. 1973, Hubka, A. Novkov, M. Kolak & S.W. Peterson, 2014

Type strain
- CBS 653.74, CCF 4545, NRRL 6326, NRRL MOLD 6326, PRM 923447

Synonyms
- Aspergillus aureofulgens

Species of fungus

Aspergillus luppii (also called A. aureofulgens) is a species of fungus in the genus Aspergillus. It is from the Flavipedes section. Aspergillus luppii produces the antimicrobics Curvularin and Dehydrocurvularin.

== Growth and morphology ==
A. luppii has been cultivated on both Czapek yeast extract agar (CYA) plates and Malt Extract Agar Oxoid® (MEAOX) plates. The growth morphology of the colonies can be seen in the pictures below.

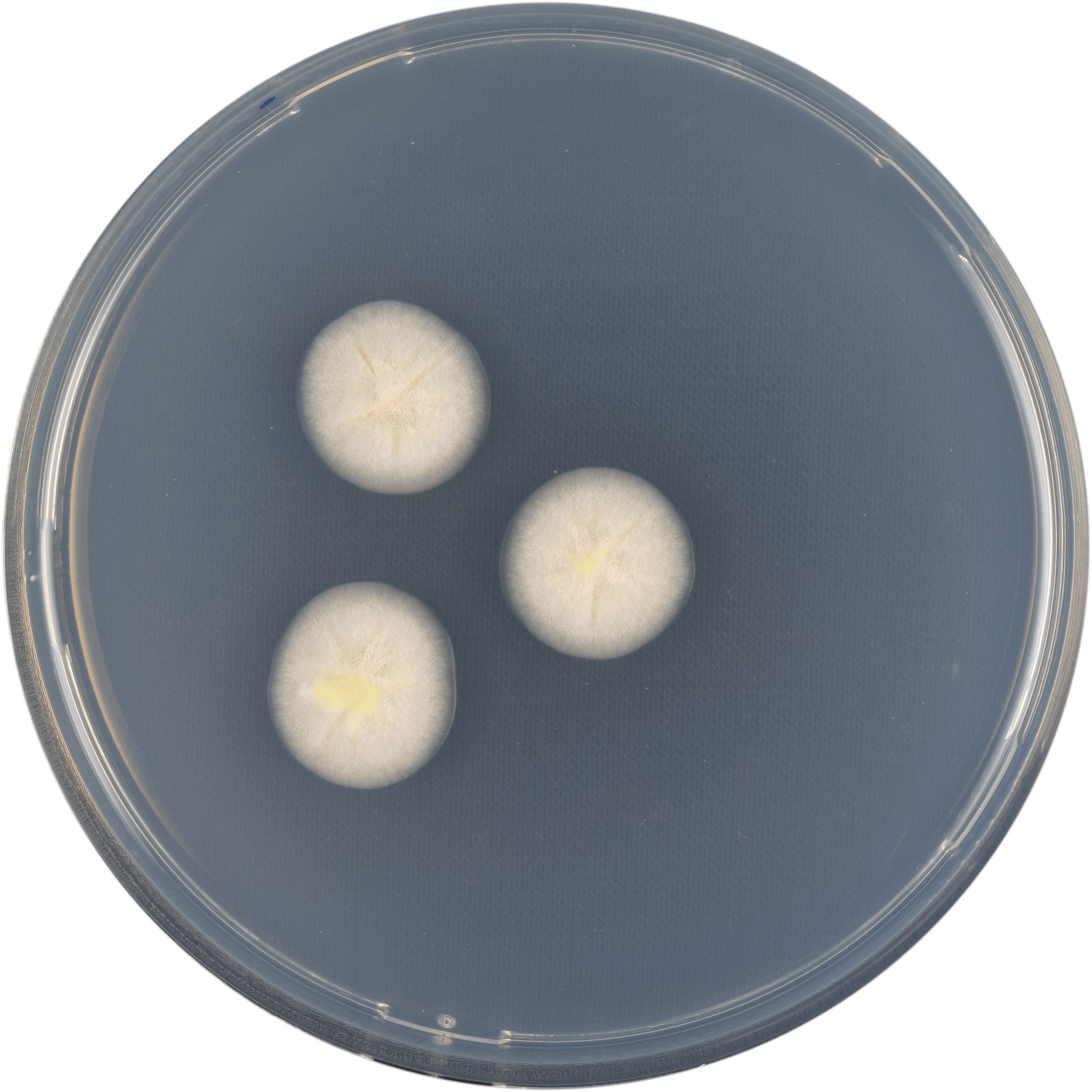
Aspergillus luppii growing on CYA plate

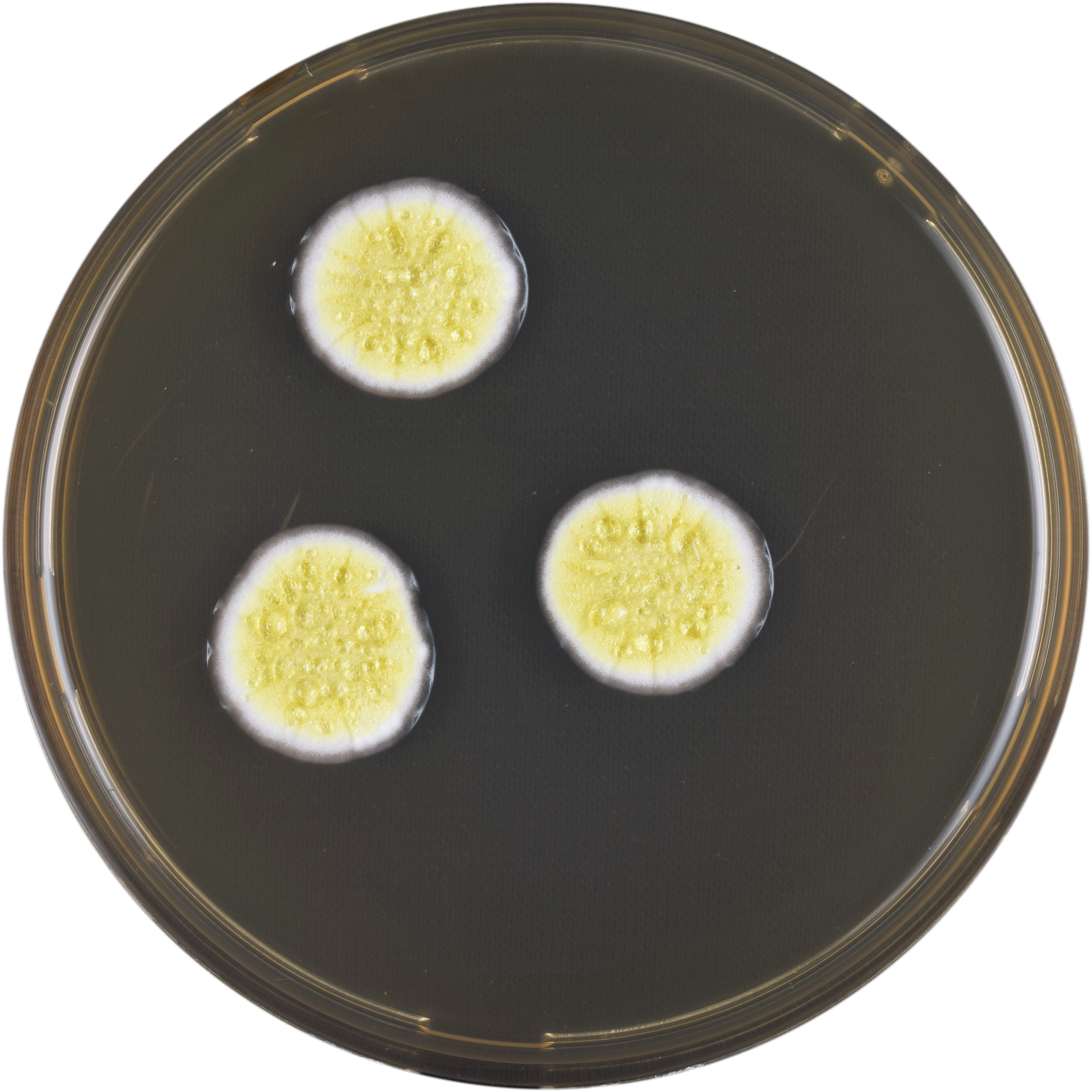
Aspergillus luppii growing on MEAOX plate
