= Aspergillus arenarioides =

Scientific classification
- Kingdom: Fungi
- Division: Ascomycota
- Class: Eurotiomycetes
- Order: Eurotiales
- Family: Aspergillaceae
- Genus: Aspergillus
- Species: A. arenarioides

Binomial name
- Aspergillus arenarioides Visagie, Hirooka & Samson (2014)

Species of fungus

Aspergillus arenarioides is a species of fungus in the genus Aspergillus. It is from the Petersonii section. The species was first described in 2014.

== Growth and morphology ==
A. arenarioides has been cultivated on both Czapek yeast extract agar (CYA) plates and Malt Extract Agar Oxoid® (MEAOX) plates. The growth morphology of the colonies can be seen in the pictures below.

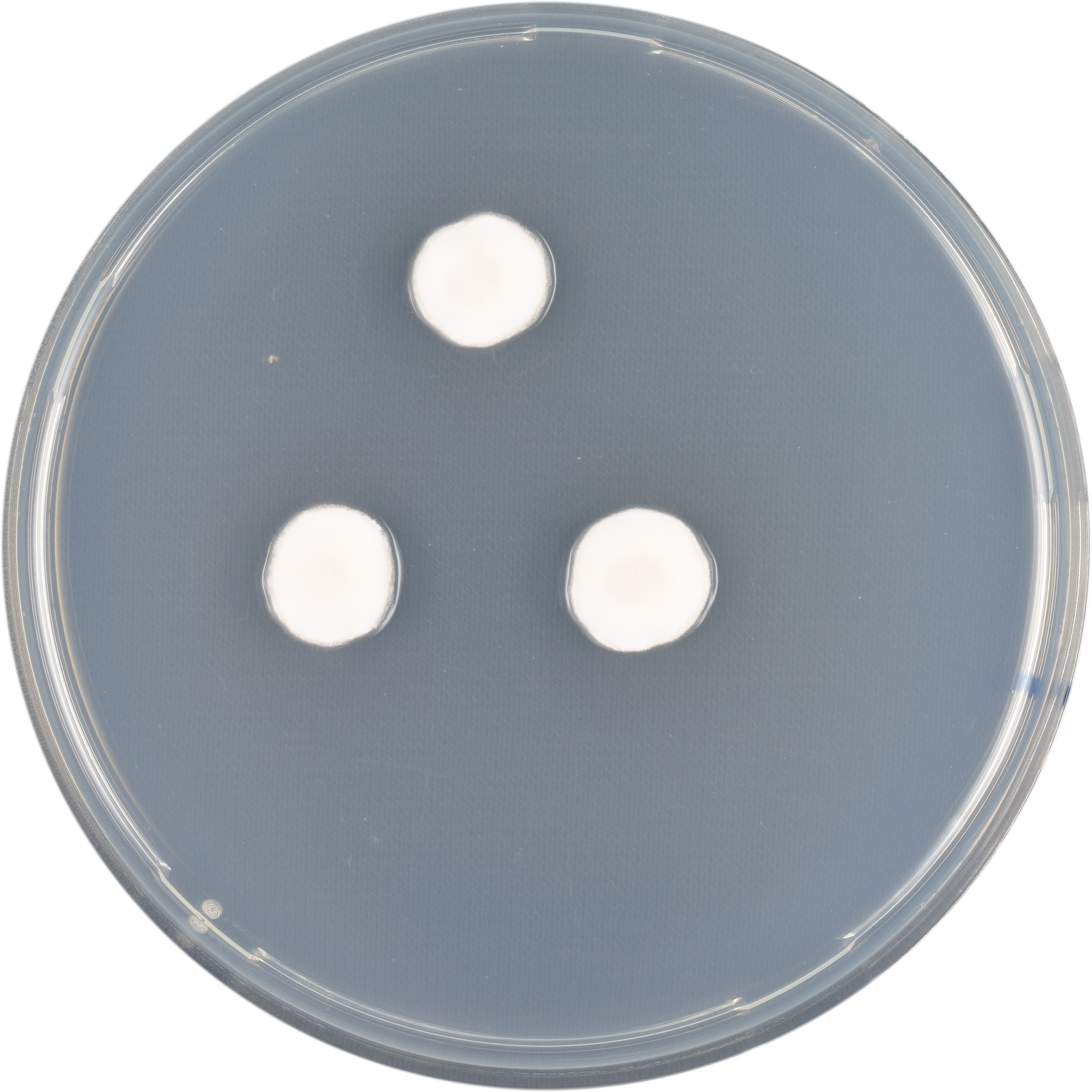
Aspergillus arenarioides growing on CYA plate

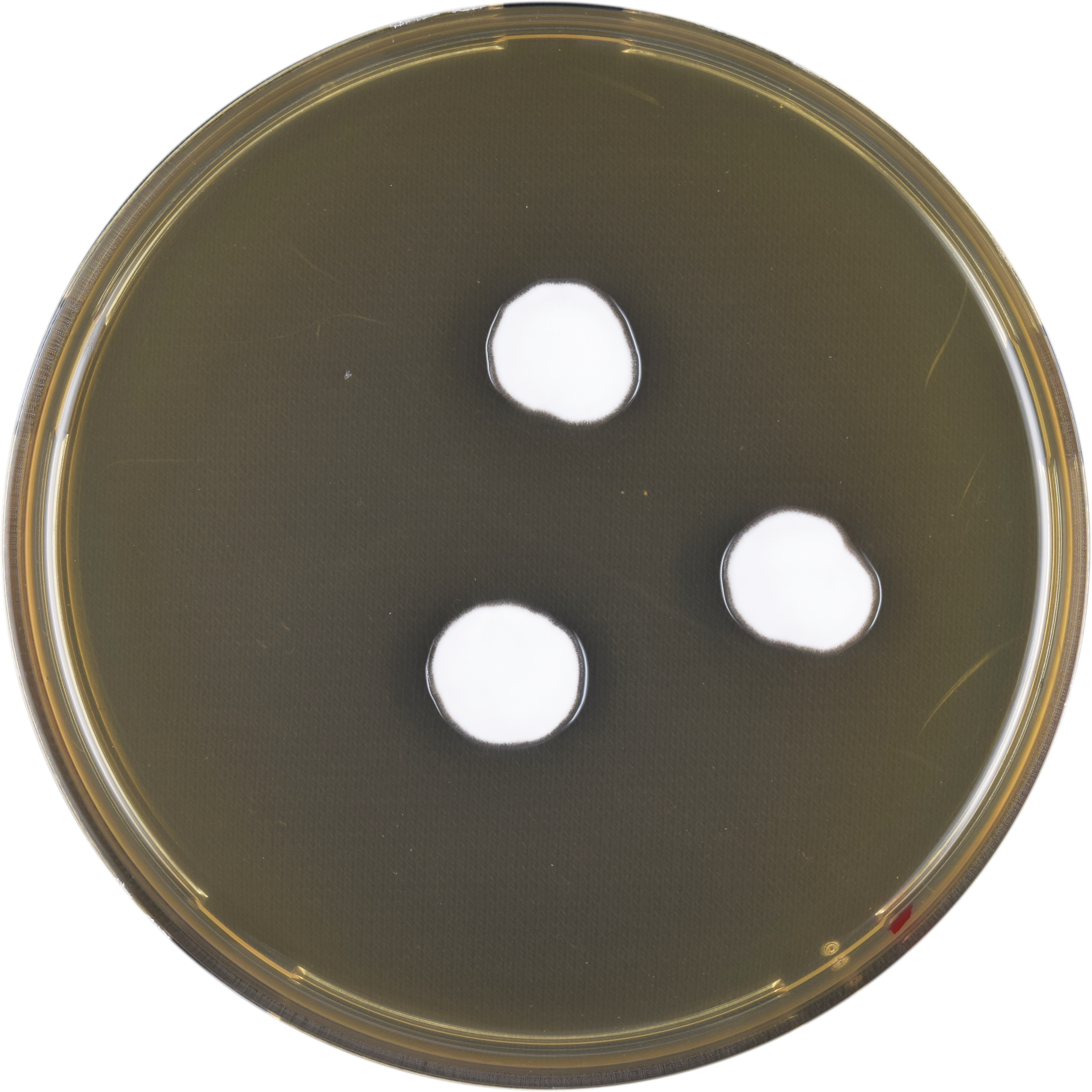
Aspergillus arenarioides growing on MEAOX plate
