= Aspergillus taichungensis =

Scientific classification
- Kingdom: Fungi
- Division: Ascomycota
- Class: Eurotiomycetes
- Order: Eurotiales
- Family: Aspergillaceae
- Genus: Aspergillus
- Species: A. taichungensis

Binomial name
- Aspergillus taichungensis Yaguchi, Someya & Udagawa (1995)

Species of fungus

Aspergillus taichungensis is a species of fungus in the family Aspergillaceae.

A. taichyngensis was first described in 1995 and has been isolated from soil in Taiwan. It was first described in 1995. The fungus is from the Candidi section, which is known for white spores. It has been shown to produce candidusin C, terphenyllin, and 3-hydoxyterphenyllin.

The genome of A. taichungensis was sequenced as a part of the Aspergillus whole genome sequencing project. The genome assembly size was 27.12 Mbp.

== Growth and morphology ==
The growth and morphology of A. taichungensis cultivated on Czapek yeast agar (CYA) plates and Malt Extract Agar Oxoid® (MEAOX) plates can be seen in the following images:

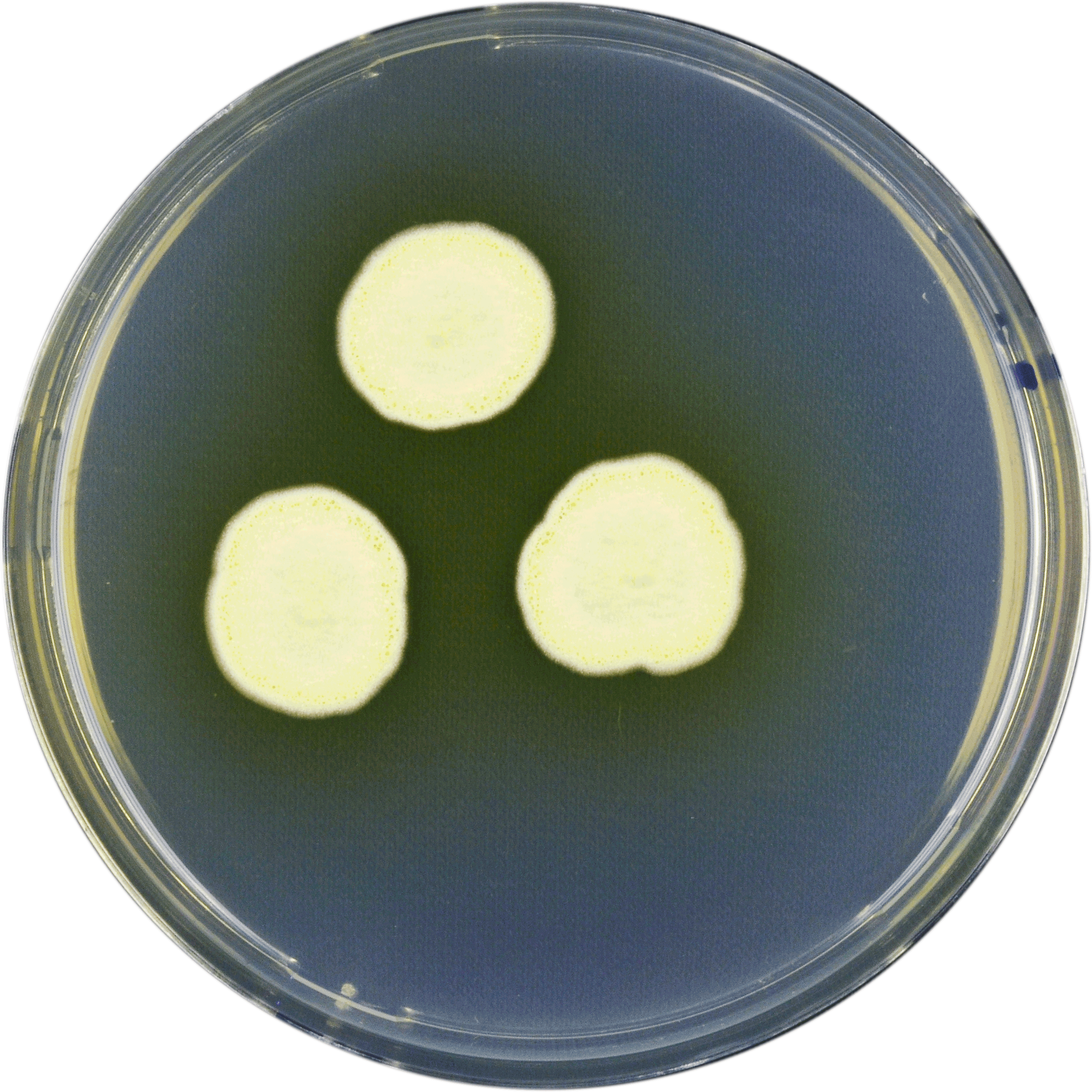
Aspergillus taichungensis growing on CYA plate

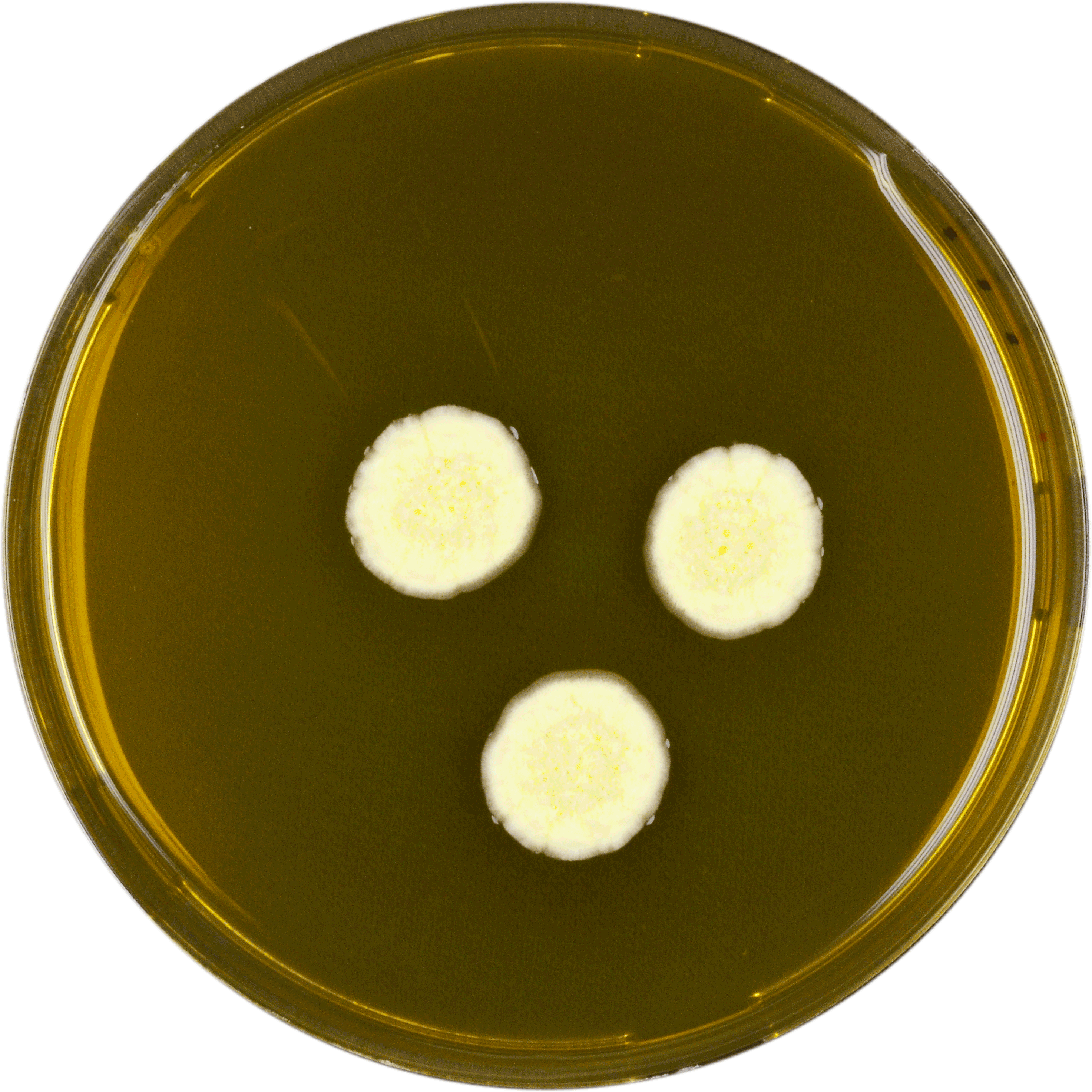
Aspergillus taichungensis growing on MEAOX plate
