= Penicillium charlesii =

Scientific classification
- Kingdom: Fungi
- Division: Ascomycota
- Class: Eurotiomycetes
- Order: Eurotiales
- Family: Aspergillaceae
- Genus: Penicillium
- Species: P. charlesii

Binomial name
- Penicillium charlesii Smith, G. 1933

Type strain
- ATCC 8730, BCRC 32728, CBS 304.48, CBS 342.51, CCRC 32728, CECT 2277, FRR 0778, IMI 040232, LSHB BB127, LSHB P146, NCIM 1227, NRRL 1887, NRRL 778, QM 6338, QM 6838, Smith P146, Thom 5262.146, WB 1887

Synonyms
- Penicillium charlessi

Species of fungus

Penicillium charlesii is a fungus species of the genus of Penicillium which produces galactocarolose and Citreoviridin.

== See also ==
- List of Penicillium species
