= Aspergillus pseudoterreus =

Scientific classification
- Kingdom: Fungi
- Division: Ascomycota
- Class: Eurotiomycetes
- Order: Eurotiales
- Family: Aspergillaceae
- Genus: Aspergillus
- Species: A. pseudoterreus

Binomial name
- Aspergillus pseudoterreus S.W. Peterson, Samson & Varga (2011)

Species of fungus

Aspergillus pseudoterreus is a species of fungus in the genus Aspergillus. It is from the Terrei section. The species was first described in 2011. It has been reported to produce aspulvinones, asterriquinones, butyrolactones, citreoisocoumarin, citreoviridin, citrinin, 3-methylorsellinic acid, terrein, and terrequinone A.

== Growth and morphology ==
A. pseudoterreus has been cultivated on both Czapek yeast extract agar (CYA) plates and Malt Extract Agar Oxoid® (MEAOX) plates. The growth morphology of the colonies can be seen in the pictures below.

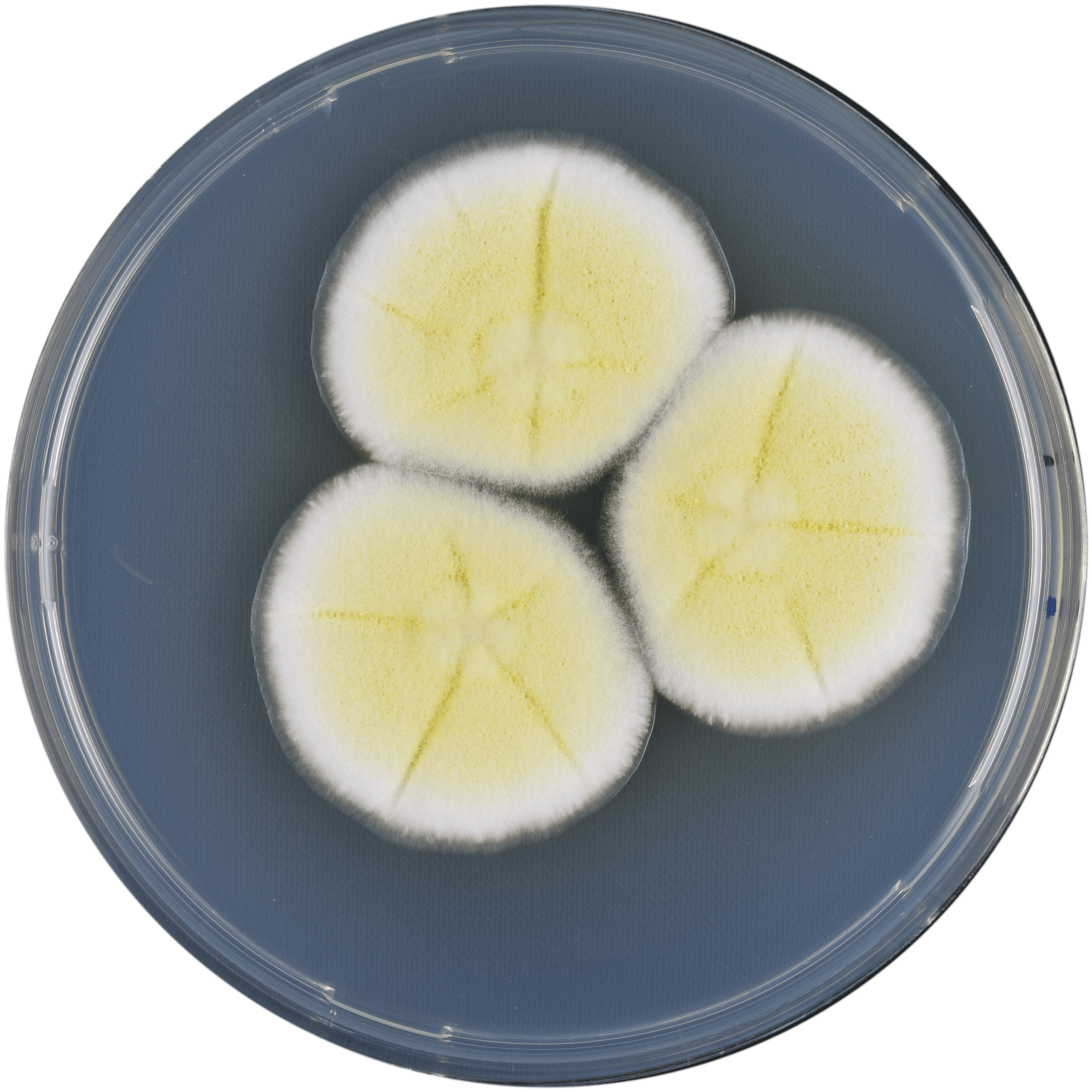
Aspergillus pseudoterreus growing on CYA plate

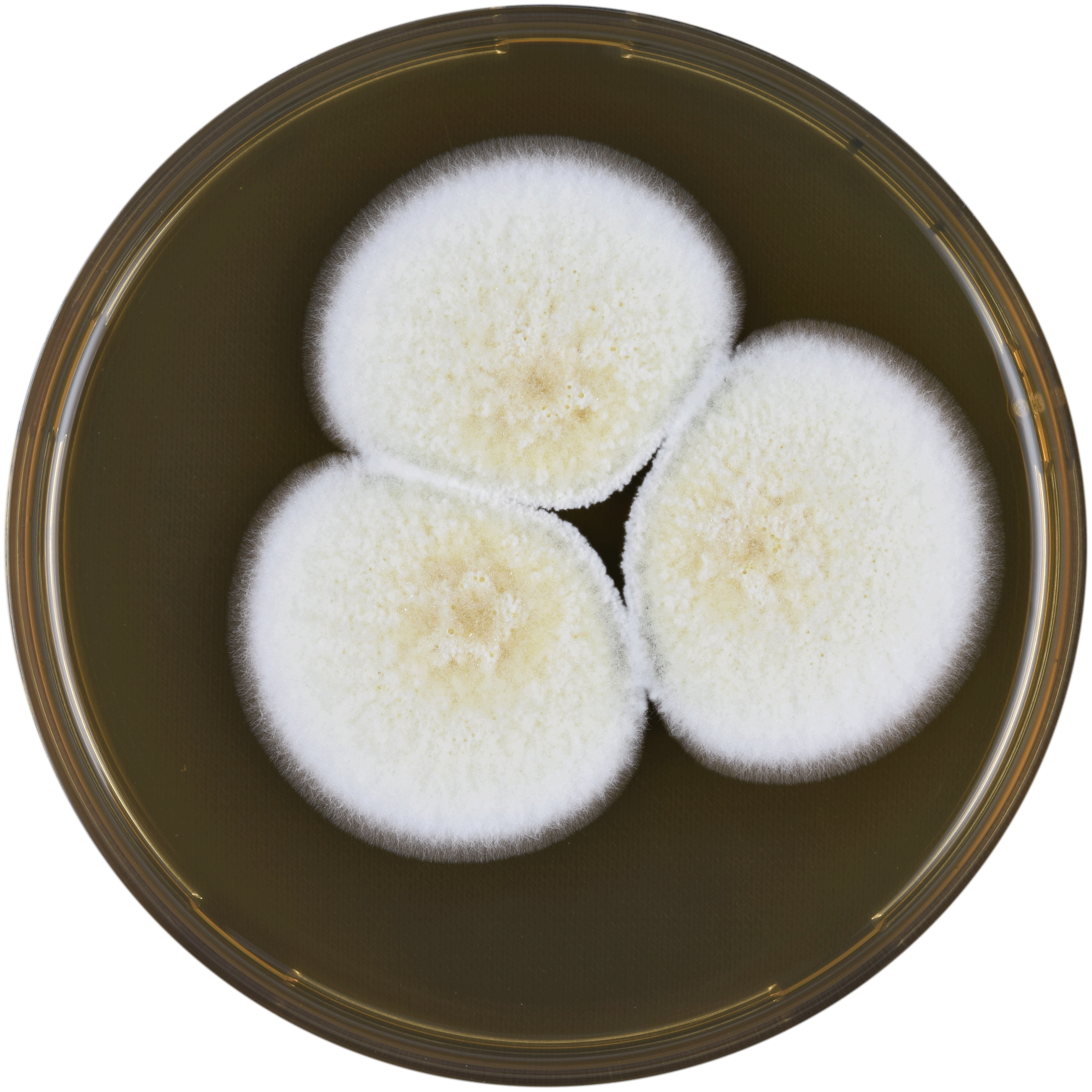
Aspergillus pseudoterreus growing on MEAOX plate
