= Aspergillus wisconsinensis =

Scientific classification
- Kingdom: Fungi
- Division: Ascomycota
- Class: Eurotiomycetes
- Order: Eurotiales
- Family: Aspergillaceae
- Genus: Aspergillus
- Species: A. wisconsinensis

Binomial name
- Aspergillus wisconsinensis A.J. Chen, Frisvad & Samson (2016)

Species of fungus

Aspergillus wisconsinensis is a species of fungus in the genus Aspergillus. It is from the Cervini section. The species was first described in 2016. It has been reported to produce an asparvenone, 4-hydroxymellein, sclerotigenin, two territrems, and cycloaspeptide.

== Growth and morphology ==
A. wisconsinensis has been cultivated on both Czapek yeast extract agar (CYA) plates and malt extract agar oxoid (MEAOX) plates. The growth morphology of the colonies can be seen in the pictures below.

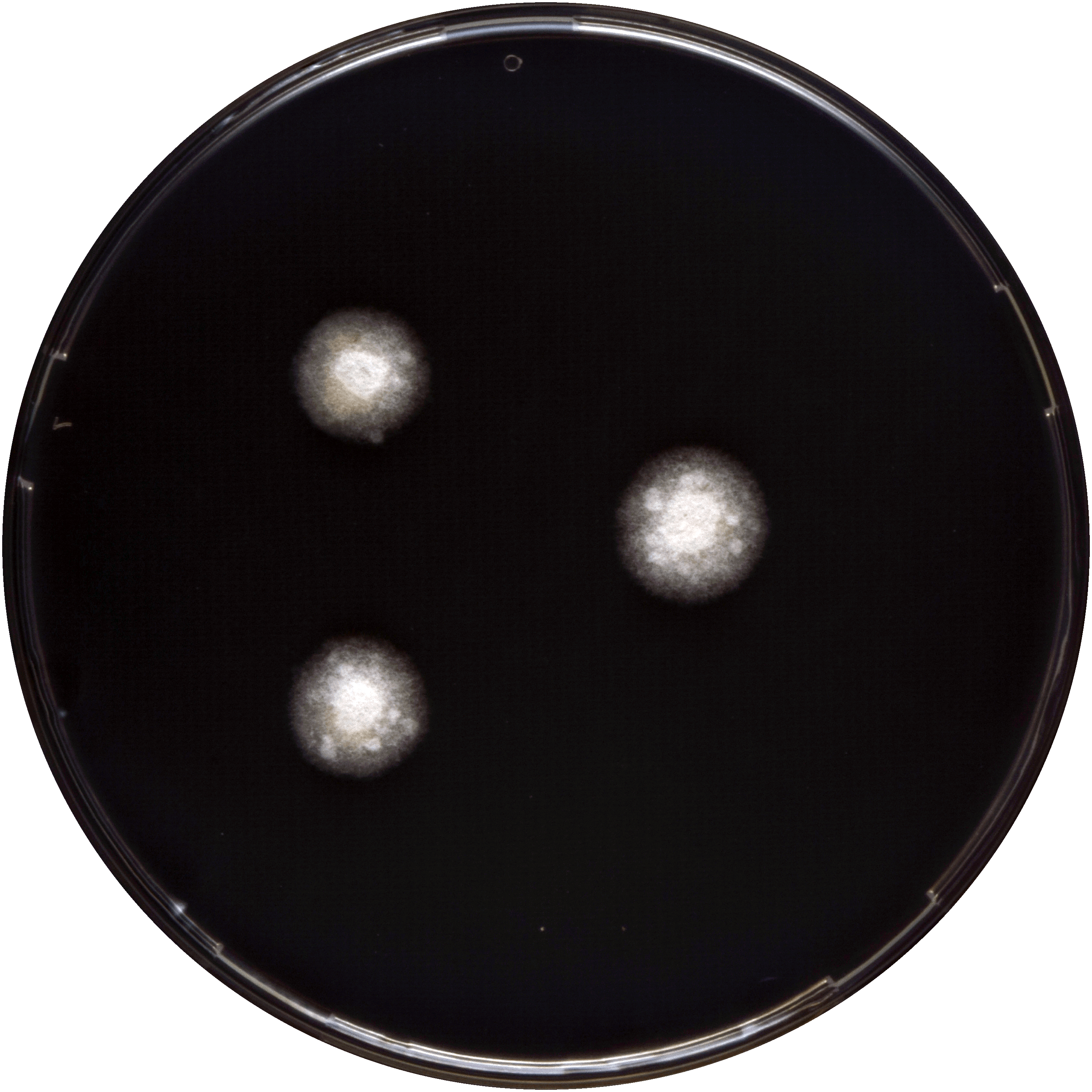
Aspergillus wisconsinensis growing on CYA plate

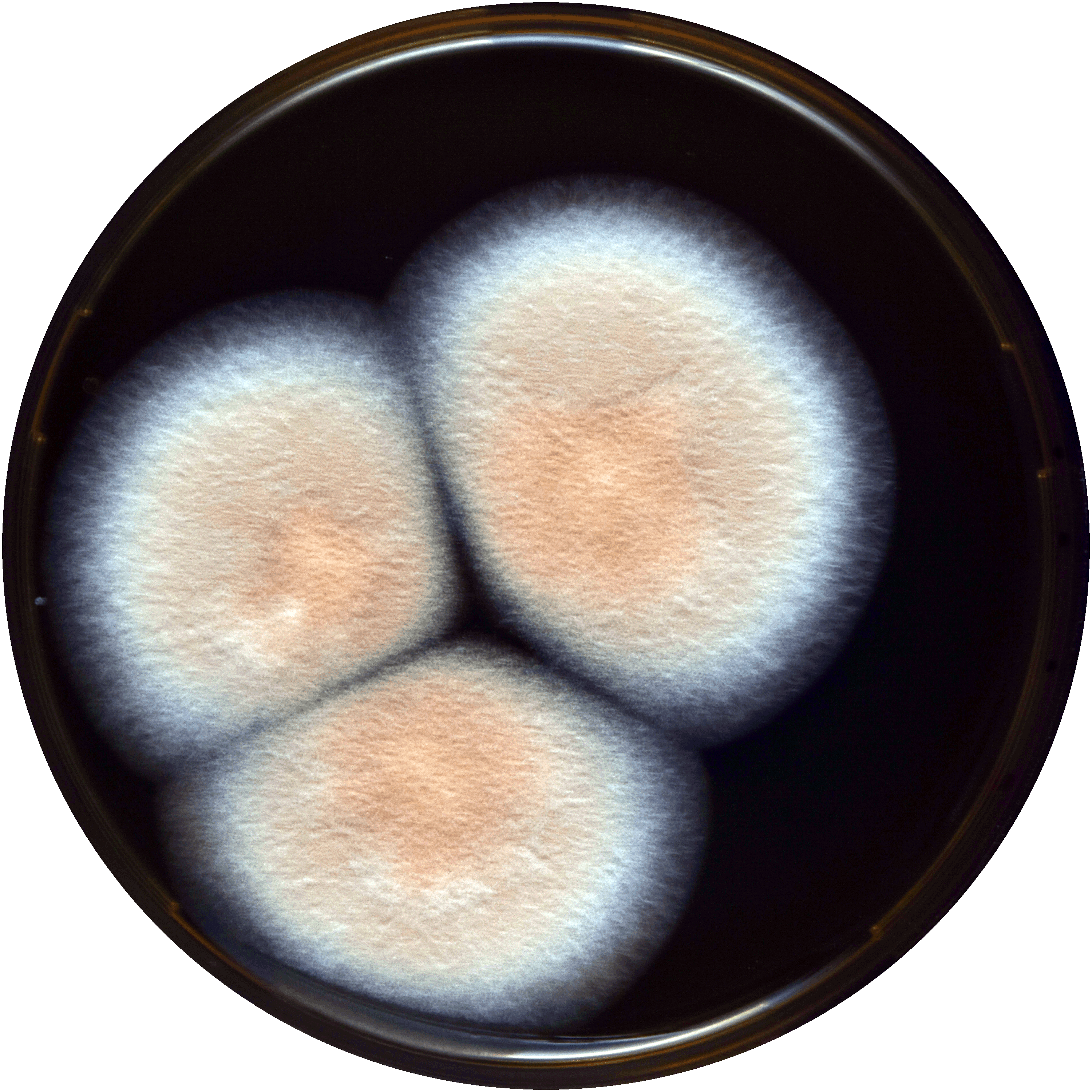
Aspergillus wisconsinensis growing on MEAOX plate
