= Aspergillus hortai =

Scientific classification
- Kingdom: Fungi
- Division: Ascomycota
- Class: Eurotiomycetes
- Order: Eurotiales
- Family: Aspergillaceae
- Genus: Aspergillus
- Species: A. hortai

Binomial name
- Aspergillus hortai (Langeron) C.W. Dodge (1935)

Species of fungus

Aspergillus hortai is a species of fungus in the genus Aspergillus. It is from the Terrei section. The species was first described in 1935. It has been isolated from the ear of a human in Brazil, soil from the Galapagos Islands, and soil from the United States. It has been reported to produce acetylaranotin, butyrolactones, citrinin, 3-methylorsellinic acid, terrein, and terrequinone A.

== Growth and morphology ==
A. hortai has been cultivated on both Czapek yeast extract agar (CYA) plates and Malt Extract Agar Oxoid® (MEAOX) plates. The growth morphology of the colonies can be seen in the pictures below.

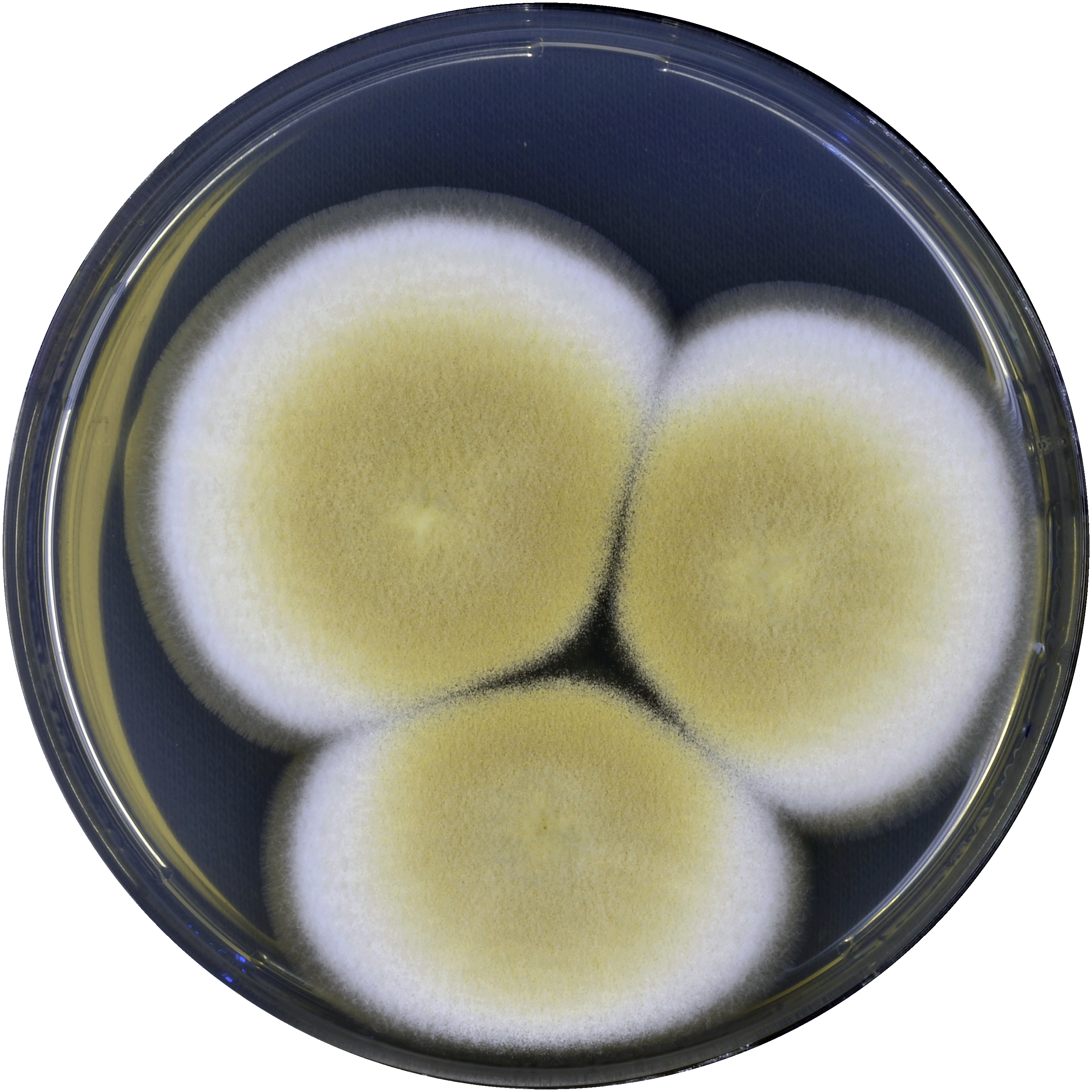
Aspergillus hortai growing on CYA plate

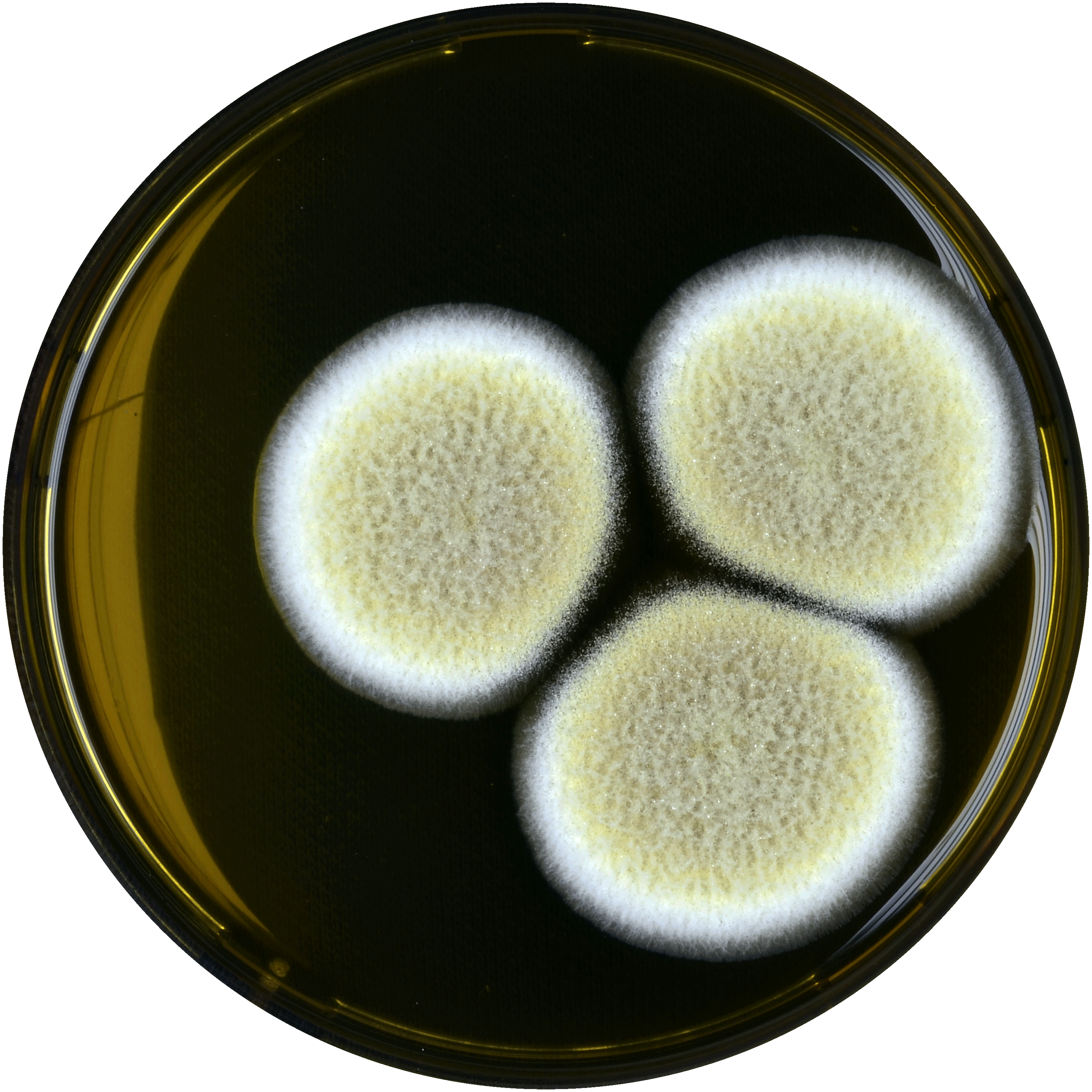
Aspergillus hortai growing on MEAOX plate
