= Penicillium ochrosalmoneum =

Scientific classification
- Kingdom: Fungi
- Division: Ascomycota
- Class: Eurotiomycetes
- Order: Eurotiales
- Family: Aspergillaceae
- Genus: Penicillium
- Species: P. ochrosalmoneum

Binomial name
- Penicillium ochrosalmoneum Udagawa, S. 1959

Type strain
- ATCC 18482, CBS 231.60, CMI 78258, FRR 0196, FRR 3322, IFO 6436, IHEM 4513, IMI 078258, LCP 59.1592, MUCL 31328, MUCL 34592, NBRC 6436, NHL 6048, NHL 6408, NI 6325, NRRL 196, NRRL 3322, NRRL A-9696, QM 7886

Synonyms
- Eupenicillium ochrosalmoneum

Species of fungus

Penicillium ochrosalmoneum is an anamorph, ascosporic species in the genus Penicillium which produces citreoviridin.
