= Aspergillus frequens =

Scientific classification
- Kingdom: Fungi
- Division: Ascomycota
- Class: Eurotiomycetes
- Order: Eurotiales
- Family: Aspergillaceae
- Genus: Aspergillus
- Species: A. frequens

Binomial name
- Aspergillus frequens Hubka, A. Nováková, M. Kolařík & S.W. Peterson (2015)

Species of fungus

Aspergillus frequens is a species of fungus in the genus Aspergillus. It is from the Flavipedes section. The species was first described in 2015.

== Growth and morphology ==
A. frequens has been cultivated on both Czapek Yeast Extract Agar (CYA) plates and Malt Extract Agar Oxoid (MEAOX) plates. The growth morphology of the colonies can be seen in the pictures below.

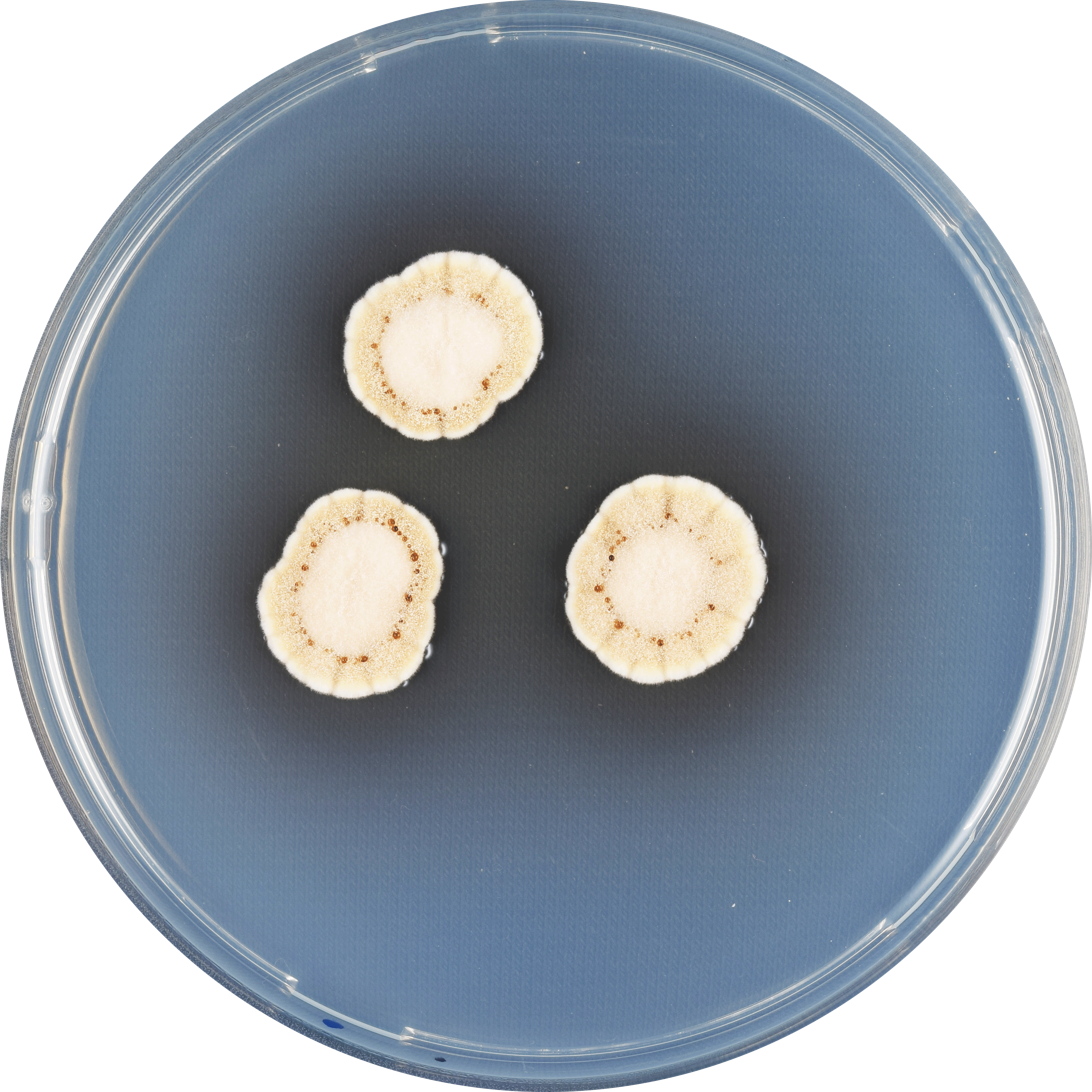
Aspergillus frequens growing on CYA plate

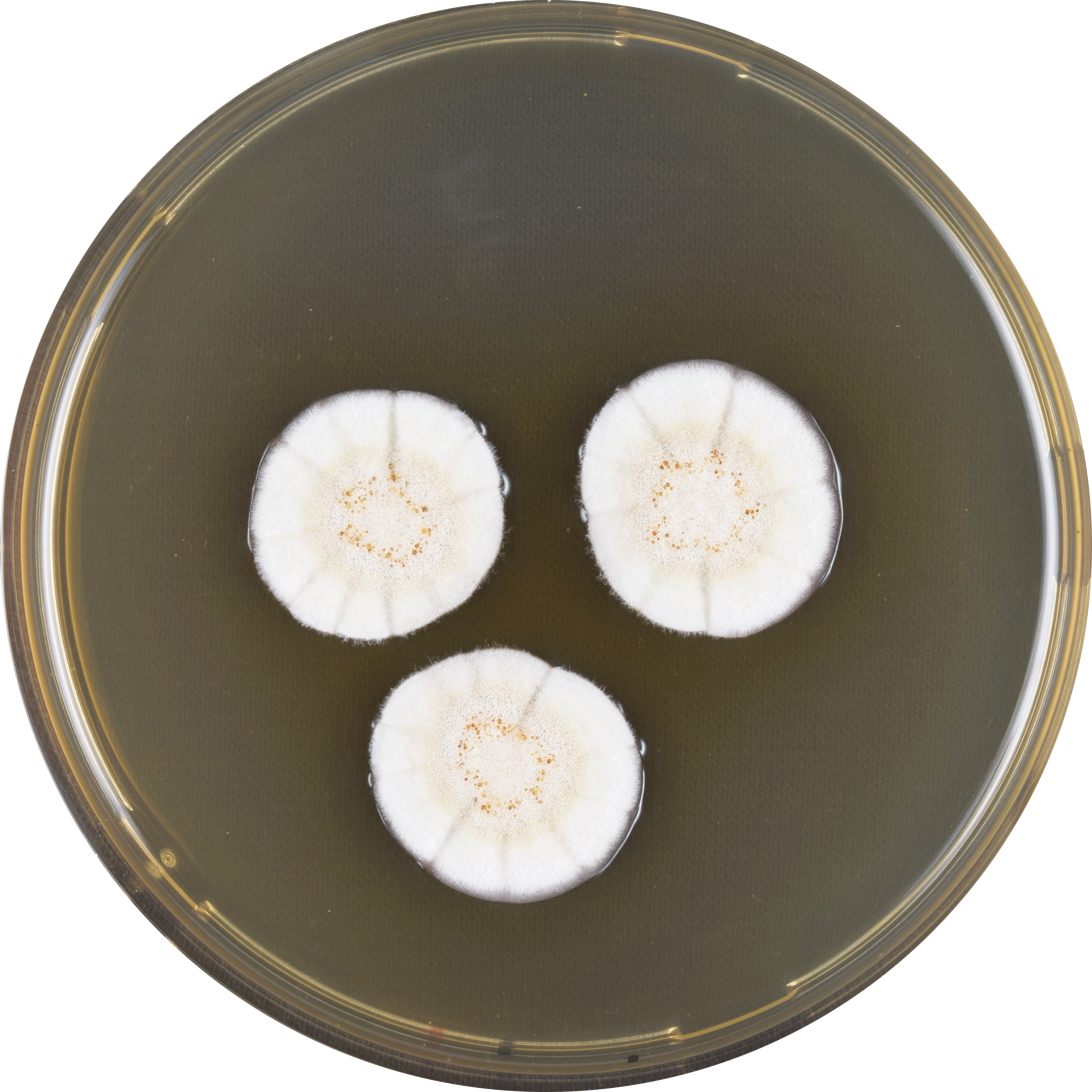
Aspergillus frequens growing on MEAOX plate
