= Penicillium citrioviride =

Scientific classification
- Domain: Eukaryota
- Kingdom: Fungi
- Division: Ascomycota
- Class: Eurotiomycetes
- Order: Eurotiales
- Family: Aspergillaceae
- Genus: Penicillium
- Species: P. citrioviride

Binomial name
- Penicillium citrioviride Biourge

Species of fungus

Penicillium citrioviride is a fungus species of the genus of Penicillium which produces neurotoxic citreoviridin.

== See also ==
- List of Penicillium species
