= Penicillium turcosoconidiatum =

Scientific classification
- Domain: Eukaryota
- Kingdom: Fungi
- Division: Ascomycota
- Class: Eurotiomycetes
- Order: Eurotiales
- Family: Aspergillaceae
- Genus: Penicillium
- Species: P. turcosoconidiatum

Binomial name
- Penicillium turcosoconidiatum Visagie, Houbraken & K. Jacobs 2014

Type strain
- CBS 138557

Species of fungus

Penicillium turcosoconidiatum is a species of fungus in the genus Penicillium which was isolated from fynbos soil in Stellenbosch, South Africa.

The specific epithet turcosoconidiatum refers to the light blue turquoise conidia it forms on malt extract agar.

== Description ==
Penicillium turcosoconidiatum is in the P. fuscum-clade of Penicillium and is distinguished from other similar species by:

- its limited growth on malt extract agar, Czapek, and yeast extract with supplements (YES) growth media
- short stipes
- size of conidia (2–2.5 μm)
- turquoise-colored conidia
