= Penicillium cairnsense =

Scientific classification
- Kingdom: Fungi
- Division: Ascomycota
- Class: Eurotiomycetes
- Order: Eurotiales
- Family: Aspergillaceae
- Genus: Penicillium
- Species: P. cairnsense

Binomial name
- Penicillium cairnsense Houbraken, J.; Frisvad, J.C.; Cole, T.; Samson, R.A. 2011

Type strain
- CBS 124325, CBS 117962, CBS 117982, CBS 118028

Species of fungus

Penicillium cairnsense is a fungus species of the genus of Penicillium which produces benzomalvins, citreoviridin, phoenicin, terrain, quinolactacin and decaturin. Penicillium cairnsense is named after Cairns, a city in Australia that is near to where this species was first isolated.

== See also ==
- List of Penicillium species
