= Charles Bluestone =

American physician

Charles D. Bluestone (April 4, 1932 - June 15, 2024) was an American physician, focusing in otitis. Bluestone was the first Eberly Professor of Pediatric Otolaryngology at the University of Pittsburgh and served as a Distinguished Professor Emeritus of Otolarngology at the University of Pittsburgh.

Bluestone died on June 15, 2024 at 92.
