= Otomycosis =

- Other names: Fungal external otitis
- Specialty: Infectious diseases
- Symptoms: Varies widely, only itching in early cases, hearing impairment if the fungal debris blocks the ear canal, severe pressure type pain in advanced cases
- Complications: Perforation of the tympanic membrane, rarely invasion of the middle ear

Otomycosis is a fungal ear infection, a superficial mycotic infection of the outer ear canal caused by fungi. It is more common in tropical or warm countries. The infection may be either subacute or acute and is characterized by itching in the ear, malodorous discharge, inflammation, pruritus, scaling, and severe discomfort or ear pain. The mycosis results in inflammation, superficial epithelial exfoliation, masses of debris containing hyphae, suppuration, and pain. Otomycosis can also cause hearing loss.

== Signs and symptoms ==
Otomycosis does not usually cause as much canal skin edema as does acute bacterial external otitis. While a severe pressure type of pain is a prominent feature of advanced cases, the ear is usually much less tender, if at all, to traction or tragal pressure. Appearance of the fungus is variable, most commonly gray, white, or black, often intermixed with cerumen and clinging to the canal skin. Gray concretions may be present.

== Cause ==
Most fungal ear infections are caused by Aspergillus niger, Aspergillus fumigatus, Penicillium and Candida albicans. Otomycosis commonly worsens from overuse of antibacterial ear drops, which should never be used for more than 7 days. In such cases the fungus is an opportunist that results from antibacterial suppression of the normal bacterial flora, combined with the steroid the drops also contain.

== Diagnosis ==
Otoscopy (exam of the ear) is best done with a binocular microscope that provides adequate lighting, depth perception, and the ability to instrument the ear to comfortably remove the fungus. Findings range from scattered saprophytic fungal colonies of various colors, causing no symptoms, to densely packed fungal debris, often intermixed with cerumen (wax), filling the entire canal and involving the tympanic membrane (eardrum). The fungus can cling to the skin and tympanic membrane, presumably because of invading hyphae, and can require significant time to accomplish complete removal.

== Treatment ==
Treatment of otomycosis typically includes microscopic suction to remove fungal mass, topical antibiotics to be discontinued, and treatment with antifungal eardrops for three weeks. The antifungal medications can be administered in the form of creams or drops applied to the ears and the most commonly used medications are azoles, a heterocyclic class of antifungal agents. Evidence in the form of high quality clinical trials on treatment methods is very weak and it is not known how effective these treatments are at improving the infection, having adverse effects (serious or not serious) when comparing different medications prescribed.

If neglected and not treated on time, the infection can cause perforation of eardrum. The only resort in such a situation can be major ear surgery, as hearing loss can be permanent.
