= Penicillium neomiczynskii =

Scientific classification
- Kingdom: Fungi
- Division: Ascomycota
- Class: Eurotiomycetes
- Order: Eurotiales
- Family: Aspergillaceae
- Genus: Penicillium
- Species: P. neomiczynskii

Binomial name
- Penicillium neomiczynskii A.L.J. Cole, Houbraken, Frisvad & Samson 2011

Type strain
- CBS 126231

Species of fungus

Penicillium neomiczynskii is a species of fungus in the genus Penicillium.
