= Terrein =

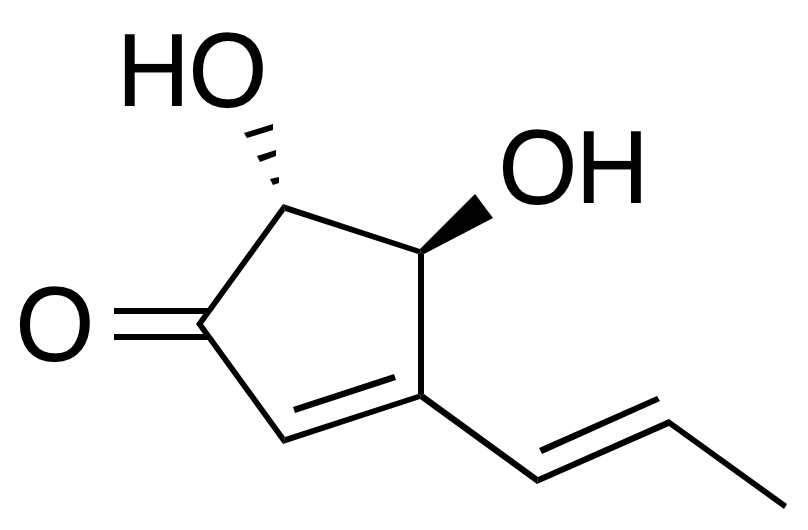

Names
- IUPAC name (4S,5R)-4,5-Dihydroxy-3-[(E)-prop-1-enyl]cyclopent-2-en-1-one

Identifiers
CAS Number	582-46-7
3D model (JSmol)	Interactive image
ChEMBL	ChEMBL506722
ChemSpider	4941440
PubChem CID	6436830
UNII	3I47HPE16N
CompTox Dashboard (EPA)	DTXSID101017469
- InChI: InChI=1S/C8H10O3/c1-2-3-5-4-6(9)8(11)7(5)10/h2-4,7-8,10-11H,1H3/b3-2+/t7-,8-/m0/s1 Key: MHOOPNKRBMHHEC-HZIBQTDNSA-N
- SMILES: C/C=C/C1=CC(=O)[C@@H]([C@H]1O)O

Properties
Chemical formula	C_{8}H_{10}O_{3}
Molar mass	154.165 g·mol^{−1}
- Except where otherwise noted, data are given for materials in their standard state (at 25 °C [77 °F], 100 kPa). Infobox references

Terrein is a fungal metabolite of Aspergillus species. Terrein forms pale yellow crystal needles. Terrein has a strong cytotoxic activity against cells with colorectal carcinoma. The strain S020 from the fungus Aspergillus terreus has the highest rate in producing terrein.
