= Dehydrocurvularin =

Names
- Preferred IUPAC name (4S,8E)-11,13-Dihydroxy-4-methyl-4,5,6,7-tetrahydro-2H-3-benzoxacyclododecine-2,10(1H)-dione

Identifiers
CAS Number	21178-57-4
3D model (JSmol)	Interactive image
ChEMBL	ChEMBL520014
ChemSpider	4942635
PubChem CID	6438143
UNII	PAU7YA7FF9
CompTox Dashboard (EPA)	DTXSID101017526
- InChI: InChI=1S/C16H18O5/c1-10-5-3-2-4-6-13(18)16-11(8-15(20)21-10)7-12(17)9-14(16)19/h4,6-7,9-10,17,19H,2-3,5,8H2,1H3/b6-4+/t10-/m0/s1 Key: AVIRMQMUBGNCKS-RWCYGVJQSA-N; InChI=1/C16H18O5/c1-10-5-3-2-4-6-13(18)16-11(8-15(20)21-10)7-12(17)9-14(16)19/h4,6-7,9-10,17,19H,2-3,5,8H2,1H3/b6-4+/t10-/m0/s1 Key: AVIRMQMUBGNCKS-RWCYGVJQBB
- SMILES: C[C@H]1CCC/C=C/C(=O)c2c(cc(cc2O)O)CC(=O)O1

Properties
Chemical formula	C_{16}H_{18}O_{5}
Molar mass	290.315 g·mol^{−1}
- Except where otherwise noted, data are given for materials in their standard state (at 25 °C [77 °F], 100 kPa). Infobox references

Dehydrocurvularin also known as Curvularin is an antimicrobial made by Penicillium. It was first isolated in 1967. It has been shown to possess antifungal properties against Candida albicans and Candida auris, as well as nematicidal efficacy against Root-knot nematode and Root-lesion nematode.
