= Aspergillus bertholletius =

Scientific classification
- Kingdom: Fungi
- Division: Ascomycota
- Class: Eurotiomycetes
- Order: Eurotiales
- Family: Aspergillaceae
- Genus: Aspergillus
- Species: A. bertholletius

Binomial name
- Aspergillus bertholletius Taniwaki, Pitt and Frisvad (2012)

Species of fungus

Aspergillus bertholletius is a species of fungus in the genus Aspergillus. It is from the Flavi section. The species was first described in 2012. It has been isolated from Brazil nuts (Bertholletia excelsa).

== Growth and morphology ==
A. bertholletius has been cultivated on both Czapek yeast extract agar (CYA) plates and Malt Extract Agar Oxoid® (MEAOX) plates. The growth morphology of the colonies can be seen in the pictures below.

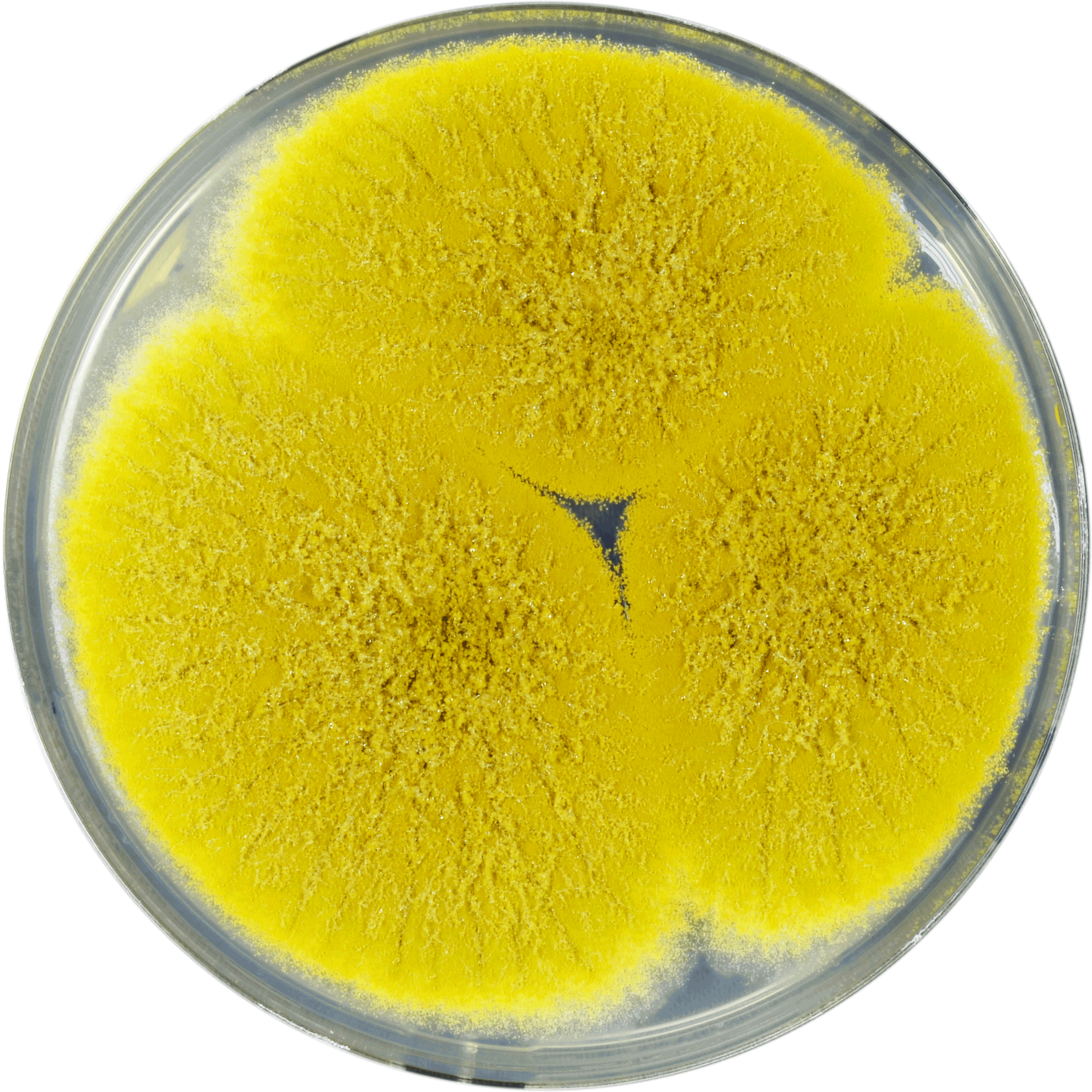
Aspergillus bertholletius growing on CYA plate

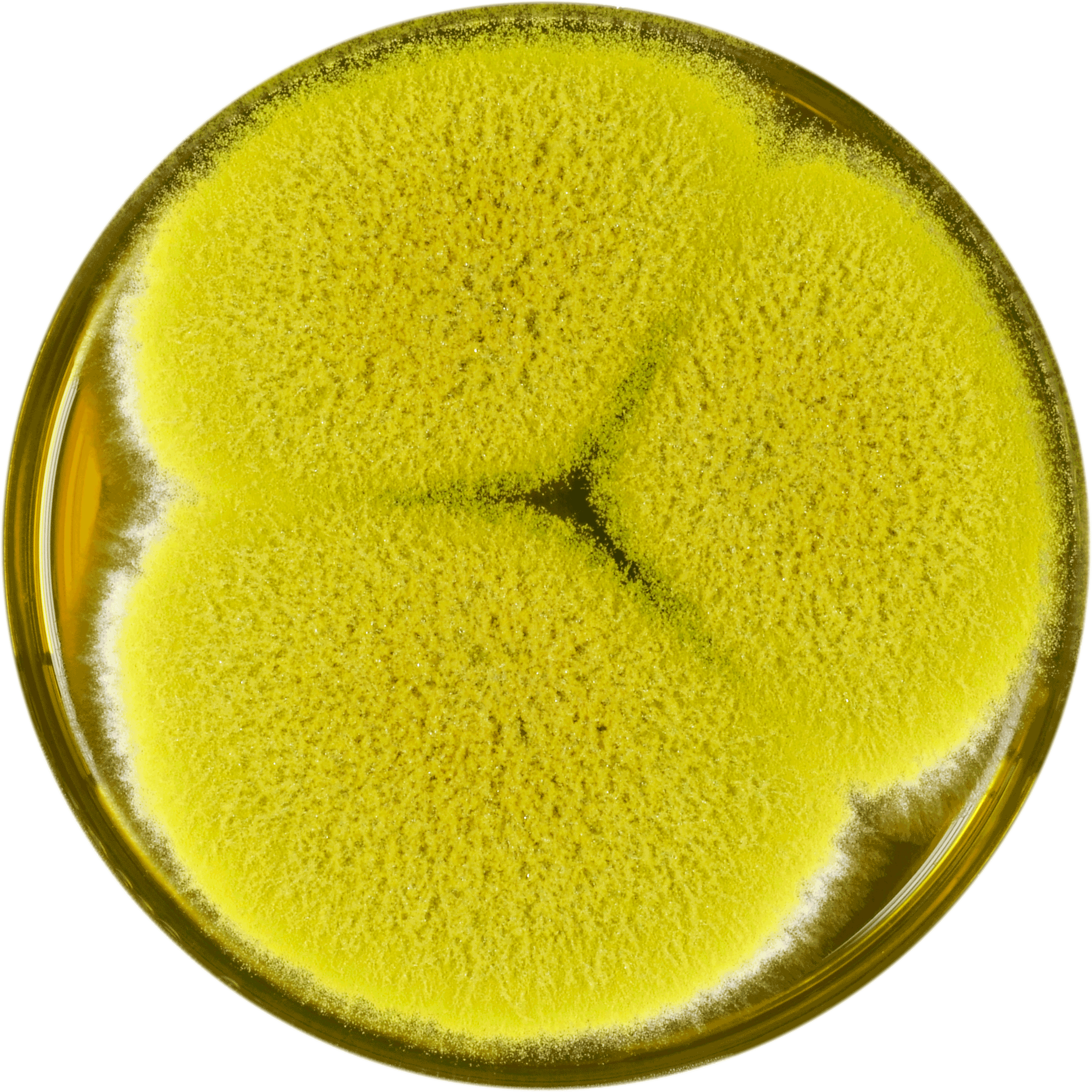
Aspergillus bertholletius growing on MEAOX plate
