= Curvularin =

Identifiers
CAS Number	10140-70-2
3D model (JSmol)	Interactive image
ChEMBL	ChEMBL478770
ChemSpider	106658
PubChem CID	119418
UNII	WT39K5T3BX
- InChI: InChI=1S/C16H20O5/c1-10-5-3-2-4-6-13(18)16-11(8-15(20)21-10)7-12(17)9-14(16)19/h7,9-10,17,19H,2-6,8H2,1H3/t10-/m0/s1 Key: VDUIGYAPSXCJFC-JTQLQIEISA-N; InChI=1/C16H20O5/c1-10-5-3-2-4-6-13(18)16-11(8-15(20)21-10)7-12(17)9-14(16)19/h7,9-10,17,19H,2-6,8H2,1H3/t10-/m0/s1 Key: VDUIGYAPSXCJFC-JTQLQIEIBB
- SMILES: C[C@H]1CCCCCC(=O)c2c(cc(cc2O)O)CC(=O)O1

Properties
Chemical formula	C_{16}H_{20}O_{5}
Molar mass	292.331 g·mol^{−1}

Hazards
- GHS labelling
Pictograms	(GHS07: Exclamation mark)
Signal word	Warning
Hazard statements	H302
Precautionary statements	P264, P270, P301+P312, P330, P501
- Except where otherwise noted, data are given for materials in their standard state (at 25 °C [77 °F], 100 kPa). Infobox references

Curvularin is an antimicrobial chemical compound produced by Penicillium and Curvularia.

== Characteristics ==
Characteristic	Value
Number of hydrogen bond acceptors	5
Number of hydrogen bond donors	2
Number of rotating bonds	0
Partition coefficient (ALogP)	3.0
Solubility (logS, log(mol/L))	-2.8
Polar surface area (PSA, Å2)	83.8
