= Czapek medium =

Medium for growing fungi in a lab

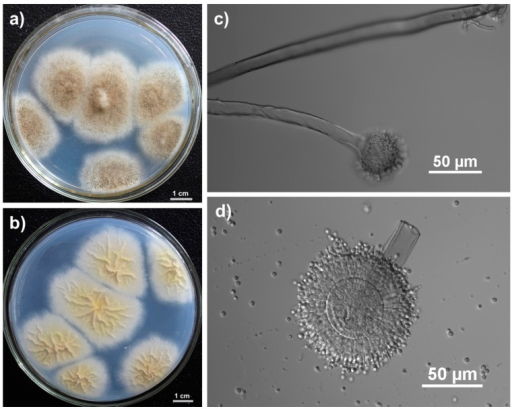
Aspergillus tubingensis growing on Czapek medium

Czapek medium, also called Czapek's agar (CZA) or Czapek-Dox medium, is a growth medium for propagating fungi and other organisms in a laboratory. It was named after its inventors, Czech botanist Friedrich Johann Franz Czapek (May 16, 1868 – July 31, 1921) and American chemist Arthur Wayland Dox (September 19, 1882 – 1954). It was developed specifically to grow the species Aspergillus niger and Penicillium camemberti. However, It works well for many different types of soil fungi and soil bacteria.

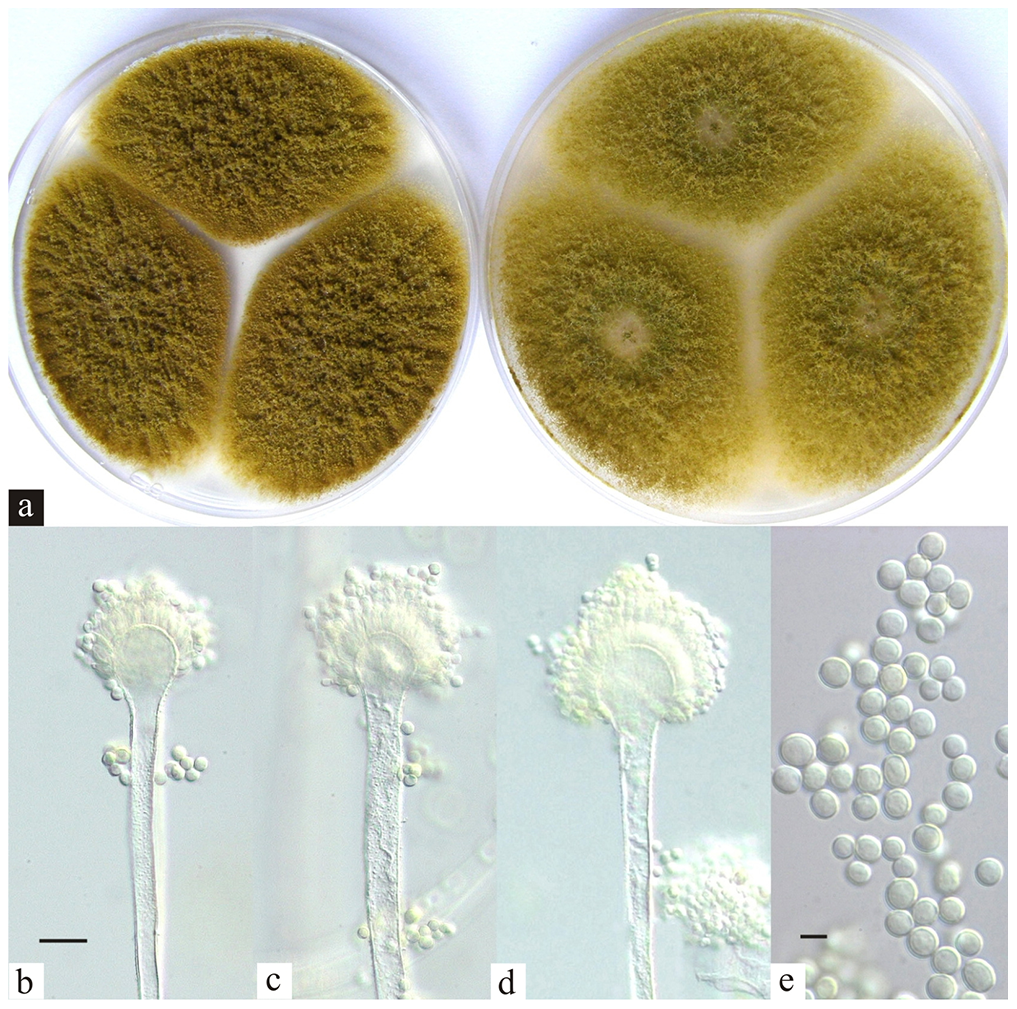
Aspergillus bertholletius on Czapek agar

Friedrich Czapek's original recipe is as follows:

- 1000 g distilled water
- 30 g sucrose or white cane sugar – energy source and sole source of carbon
- 1 g dipotassium phosphate – buffering agent
- 0.5 g magnesium sulfate – source of trace minerals
- 0.5 g potassium chloride – source of trace minerals
- 0.01 g ferrous sulfate – source of trace minerals

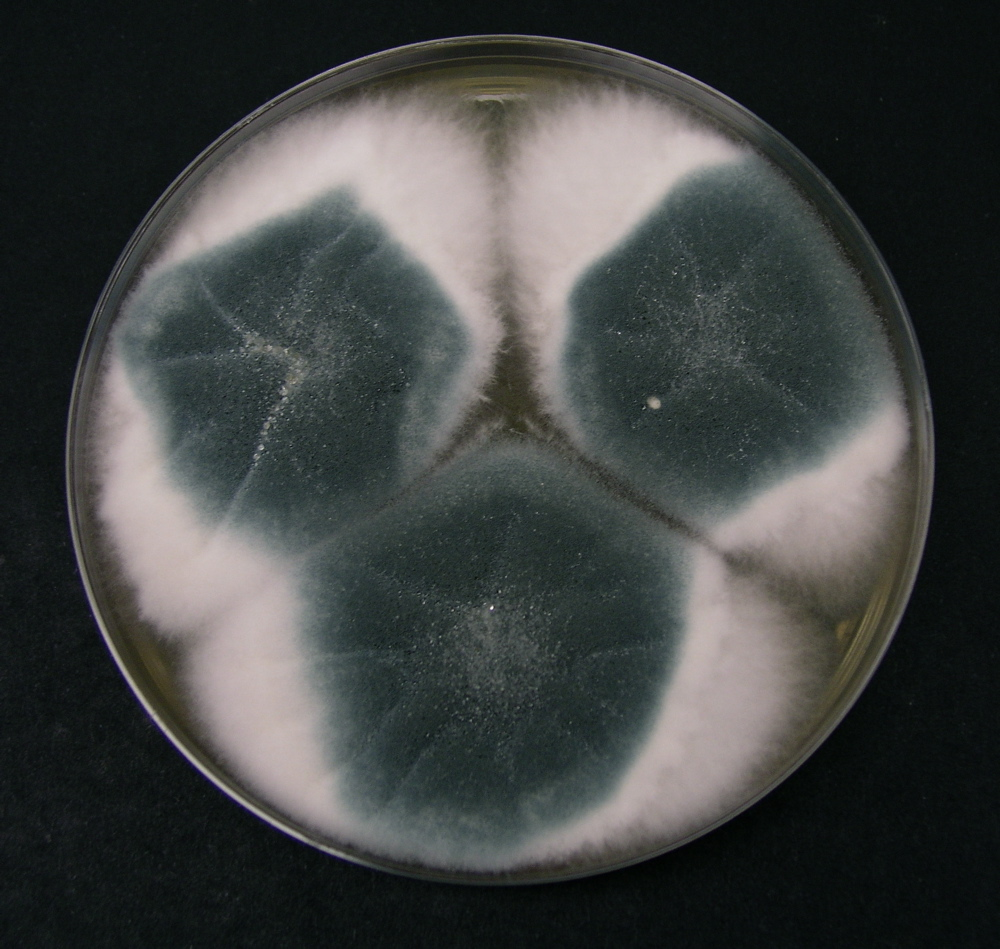
Aspergillus fumigatus on Czapek agar

Arthur Wayland Dox added 2 g of sodium nitrate in his version, to provide a sole source of nitrogen that is inorganic. This makes the medium a selective growth medium as only organisms that can use inorganic nitrogen can grow. Many modern recipes add 15 g of agar-agar powder to make a solid medium.
