= Citreoviridin =

Mycotoxin

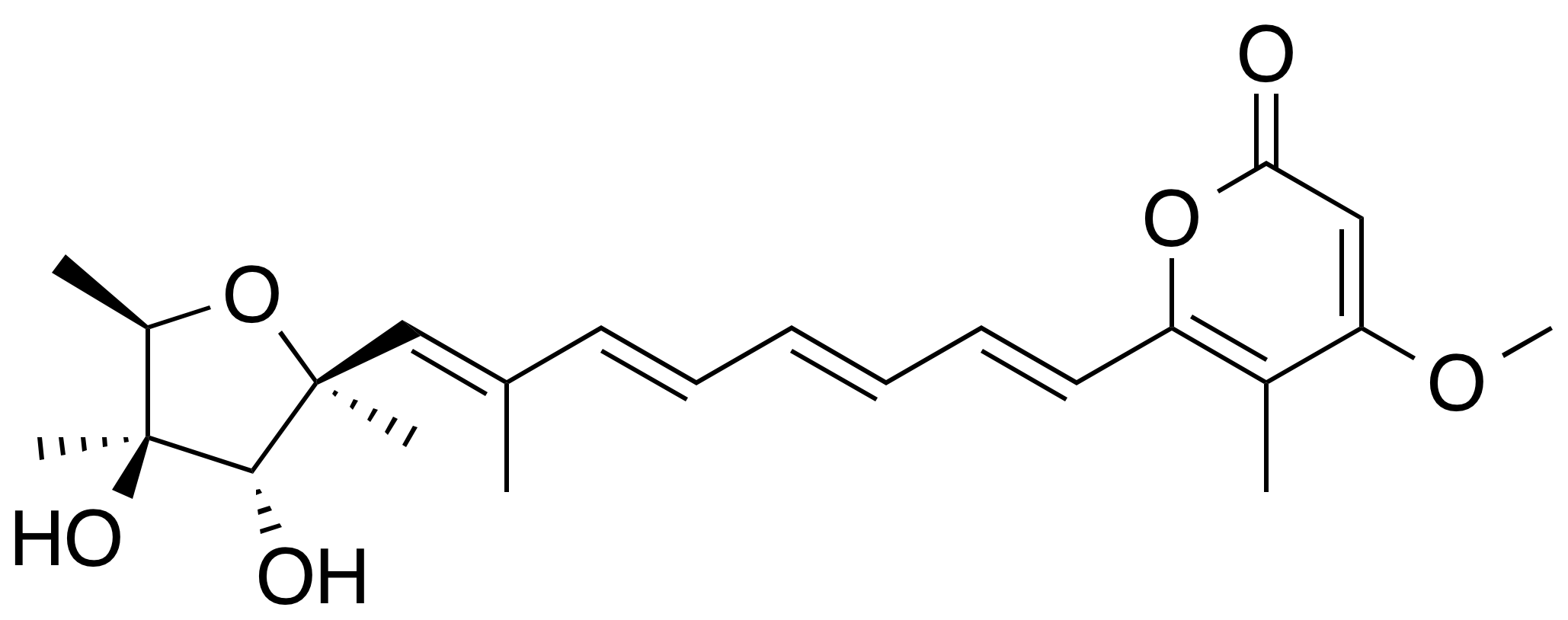

Identifiers
- IUPAC name: 6-[(1E,3E,5E,7E)-8-[(2S,3R,4R,5R)-3,4-dihydroxy-2,4,5-trimethyloxolan-2-yl]-7-methylocta-1,3,5,7-tetraenyl]-4-methoxy-5-methylpyran-2-one
- CAS Number: 25425-12-1
- PubChem CID: 6436023
- ChemSpider: 4940705
- UNII: OWX7Q6CF4F
- CompTox Dashboard (EPA): DTXSID301017584
- ECHA InfoCard: 100.164.506

Chemical and physical data
- Formula: C_{23}H_{30}O_{6}
- Molar mass: 402.487 g·mol^{−1}
- 3D model (JSmol): Interactive image
- SMILES: C[C@@H]1[C@]([C@H]([C@](O1)(C)/C=C(\C)/C=C/C=C/C=C/C2=C(C(=CC(=O)O2)OC)C)O)(C)O
- InChI: InChI=1S/C23H30O6/c1-15(14-22(4)21(25)23(5,26)17(3)29-22)11-9-7-8-10-12-18-16(2)19(27-6)13-20(24)28-18/h7-14,17,21,25-26H,1-6H3/b8-7+,11-9+,12-10+,15-14+/t17-,21+,22+,23+/m1/s1; Key:JLSVDPQAIKFBTO-OMCRQDLASA-N

Citreoviridin is a mycotoxin which is produced by Penicillium and Aspergillus species. If rice, corn, cereals or meat products are contaminated with Penicillin citreoviridin, citreoviridin can be produced if the food is stored in a damp place. Consuming food which is contaminated with citreoviridin can cause the disease cardiac beri beri. Furthermore, it damages liver and kidneys.
