= Byssochlamys =

Scientific classification
- Kingdom: Fungi
- Division: Ascomycota
- Class: Eurotiomycetes
- Order: Eurotiales
- Family: Thermoascaceae
- Genus: Byssochlamys; Westling (1909)

Type species
- Byssochlamys nivea Westling (1909)

Genus of fungi

Byssochlamys is a former genus of fungi in the Trichocomaceae family, containing teleomorph forms of Paecilomyces. Several species of the genus Byssochlamys were well known to be associated with food spoilage, especially acidic heat-processed foods. A health concern was the production of the mycotoxin patulin in fruit juices, as well as byssochlamic acid and mycophenolic acid.

== Taxonomy ==
First described by Swedish botanist Richard Westling in 1909, it contained teleomorph forms of the genus Paecilomyces, traditionally covering anamorphic forms. With the adaptation of the "one fungus : one name" rule, Byssochlamys is considered a synonym of Paecilomyces.

The database Mycobank lists 9 legitimate species names, most of which are now considered to belong in the genus Paecilomyces.

- Byssochlamys fulva, now Paecilomyces fulvus.
- Byssochlamys lagunculariae, now Paecilomyces lagunculariae.
- Byssochlamys nivea and B. trisporus, now Paecilomyces niveus.
- Byssochlamys spectabilis, now Paecilomyces variotii.
- Byssochlamys striata, now Pseudohamigera striata.
- Byssochlamys verrucosa, now Thermoascus verrucosus.
- Byssochlamys musticola and Byssochlamys zollerniae are currently not assigned an updated taxonomy.
