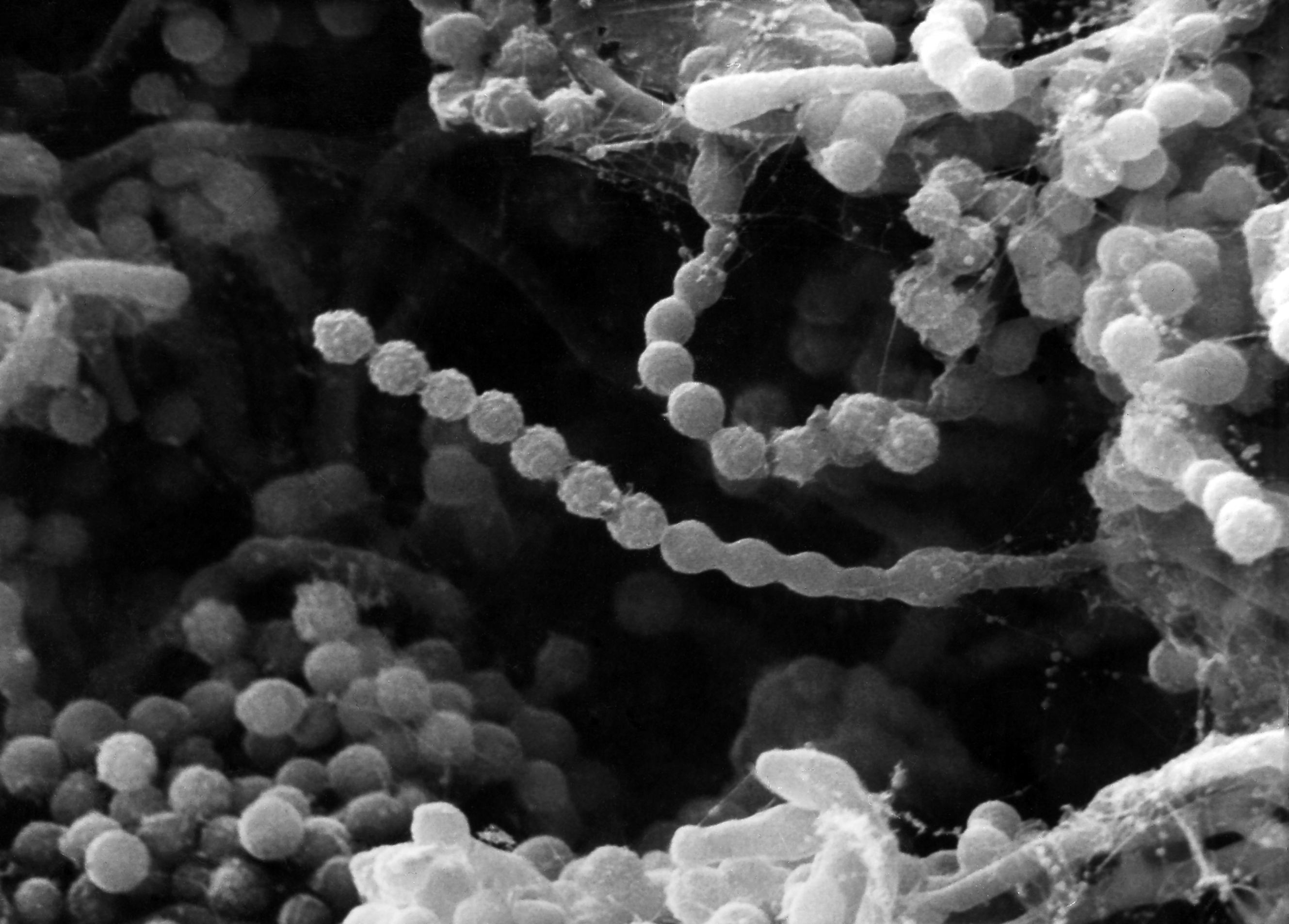
- Scanning electron micrograph of Paecilomyces variotii

Scientific classification
- Kingdom: Fungi
- Division: Ascomycota
- Class: Eurotiomycetes
- Order: Eurotiales
- Family: Thermoascaceae
- Genus: Paecilomyces; Bainier (1907)

Type species
- Paecilomyces variotii Bainier (1907)

Synonyms
- Byssochlamys Westling (1909); Corollium Sopp (1912); Graphidium Lindau (1909); Spicariopsis R.Heim (1939)

= Paecilomyces =

Genus of fungi

Paecilomyces is a genus of fungi. A number of species in this genus are plant pathogens.

Several of the entomopathogenic species, such as "Paecilomyces fumosoroseus" have now been placed in the genus Isaria, in the order Hypocreales and family Cordycipitaceae.

In 1974, R.A. Samson transferred the nematicidal species Paecilomyces lilacinus to this genus. However, publications in the 2000s (decade) indicated that the genus Paecilomyces was not monophyletic, and the new genus Purpureocillium was created to hold the taxon which includes P. lilacinum: with both parts of the name referring to the purple conidia produced by the fungus.

== Species ==
Traditionally, Paecilomyces held strictly asexual species and later housed numerous anamorphic forms of fungi with their teleomorph described to a separate genus. From 41 described species in 2000 and over 100 known combinations in this genus, the amount of species in Paecilomyces reduced to 10 described species in 2020 following the adaptation of the "one fungus one name" rule.

- Paecilomyces brunneolus
- Paecilomyces clematidis Spetik, Eichmeier, Gramaje & Berraf-Tebbal (2022)
- Paecilomyces dactylethromorphus
- Paecilomyces divaricatus
- Paecilomyces formosus Urquhart (2023)
- Paecilomyces fulvus
- Paecilomyces lagunculariae
- Paecilomyces niveus
- Paecilomyces paravariotii Urquhart (2023)
- Paecilomyces penicilliformis Jurjević & Hubka (2020)
- Paecilomyces tabacinus
- Paecilomyces variotii
- Paecilomyces zollerniae

Species combinations not listed by Houbraken et al. 2020

- Paecilomyces albus
- Paecilomyces andoi
- Paecilomyces aspergilloides
- Paecilomyces atrovirens
- Paecilomyces austriacus
- Paecilomyces borysthenicus
- Paecilomyces breviramosus
- Paecilomyces byssochlamydoides
- Paecilomyces cinnamomeus
- Paecilomyces clavisporus
- Paecilomyces crassipes
- Paecilomyces cremeoroseus
- Paecilomyces cylindricosporus
- Paecilomyces echinosporus
- Paecilomyces erectus
- Paecilomyces griseiviridis
- Paecilomyces guaensis
- Paecilomyces hawkesii
- Paecilomyces huaxiensis
- Paecilomyces indicus
- Paecilomyces laeensis
- Paecilomyces lecythidis
- Paecilomyces marinum
- Paecilomyces maximus
- Paecilomyces militaris
- Paecilomyces musicola
- Paecilomyces neomarinum
- PAecilomyces niphetodes
- Paecilomyces odonatae
- Paecilomyces parvisporus
- Paecilomyces pascuus
- Paecilomyces persimplex
- Paecilomyces puntonii
- Paecilomyces ramosus
- Paecilomyces rariramus
- Paecilomyces simplex
- Paecilomyces smilanensis
- Paecilomyces spectabilis
- Paecilomyces stipitatus
- Paecilomyces subflavus
- Paecilomyces subglobosus
- Paecilomyces suffultus
- Paecilomyces tenuis
- Paecilomyces victoriae
- Paecilomyces vinaceus
- Paecilomyces viridulus
- Paecilomyces zollerniae

Species to be ranked in Clavicipitaceae

- Paecilomyces antarcticus
- Paecilomyces niphetodes
- Paecilomyces penicillatus
- Paecilomyces purpureus
- Paecilomyces verticillatus
- Paecilomyces wawuensis

Species formerly described in Paecilomyces

- Class Eurotiomycetes
  - Order Eurotiales
    - Family Aspergillaceae
      - Genus Evansstolkia: P. leycettanus
      - Genus Penicillium: P. burci, P. ehrlichii, P. lineatum, P. mandshuricus
    - Family Thermoascaceae
      - Genus Thermoascus: P. aegyptiacus, P. crustaceus, P. taitungiacus, P. verrucosus
    - Family Trichocomaceae
      - Genus Talaromyces: P. aerugineus, P. cinnabarinus
      - Genus Sagenomella: P. griseoviridis, P. humicola, P. striatisporus, P. variabilis,
- Class Leotiomycetes
  - Order Helotiales
    - Family Pleuroascaceae
      - Genus Venustampulla: P. parvus
- Class Sordariomycetes
  - Order incertae sedis
      - Genus Chlorocillium: P. griseus
      - Genus Sphaeronaemella: P. betae
    - Order Cephalothecales
    - Family Cephalothecaceae
      - Genus Phialemonium: P. flavescens and P. inflatus
  - Order Hypocreales
      - Genus Acremonium: P. terricola
    - Family Bionectriaceae
      - Genus Sesquicillium: P. buxi
      - Genus Waltergamsia: P. fusidioides
      - Genus Verruciconidia: P. persicinus
    - Family Clavicipiteae
      - Genus Keithomyces: P. carneus
      - Genus Marquandomyces: P. marquandii
      - Genus Metarhizium: P. paranaensis, P. reniformis, P. viridis
    - Family Cordycipitaceae
      - Genus Cordyceps: P. amoene-roseus, P. cateniannulatus, P. cateniobliquus, P. coleopterorum, P. farinosus, P. fumosoroseus, P. hibernicum and P. isarioides, P. ghanensis, P. gunnii, P. heliothis and P. tenuipes, P. javanicus, P. loushanensis
      - Genus Isaria: P. cicadae, P. xylariiformis
      - Genus Samsoniella: P. hepiali
    - Family Nectriaceae
      - Genus Mariannaea: P. elegans
      - Genus Neocosmospora: P. fuscus
    - Family Ophiocordycipitaceae
      - Genus Purpureocillium: P. lilacinus as well as P. nostocoides
      - Genus Pleurocordyceps: P. sinensis
    - Family Sarocladiaceae
      - Genus Sarocladium: P. bacillisporus, P. ochraceus
    - Family Tilachlidiaceae
      - Genus Septofusidium: P. berolinensis, P. herbarum
    - Family Valsonectriaceae
      - Genus Valsonectria: P. roseolus
  - Order Microascales
    - Family Microascaceae
      - Genus Microascus: P. fuscatus
  - Order Sordariales
    - Family Chaetomiaceae
      - Genus Acrophialophora: P. ampullaris, P. ampulliphoris, P. biformis, P. cinereus, P. curticatenatus, P. furcatus, P. fusisporus, P. major,
  - Order Trichosphaeriales
    - Family Trichosphaeriaceae
      - Genus Verticillium: P. baarnensis, P. coccosporus, P. eriophytis, P. insectorum, P. sulfurellum

incertae sedis Ascomycota

      - Genus Sagrahamata: P. iriomoteanus
      - Genus Spicaria: P. canadensis, P. cossus, P. fimetarius, P. longipes

== See also ==
- Cordyceps
- Tarsonemidae
