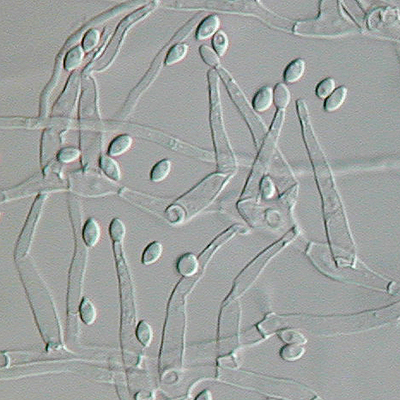

Scientific classification
- Kingdom: Fungi
- Division: Ascomycota
- Class: Eurotiomycetes
- Order: Eurotiales
- Family: Thermoascaceae
- Genus: Paecilomyces
- Species: P. variotii

Binomial name
- Paecilomyces variotii Bainier (1907)

Synonyms
- Byssochlamys spectabilis (Udagawa & Shoji Suzuki) Houbraken & Samson (2008); Paecilomyces aureocinnamomeum (Biourge) Thom (1930); Paecilomyces varioti; Penicillium aureocinnamomeum Biourge (1923); Penicillium variotii (Bainier) Sacc. (1913); Talaromyces spectabilis Udagawa & Shoji Suzuki (1994)

= Paecilomyces variotii =

Species of fungus

Paecilomyces variotii, also known by the name Byssochlamys spectabilis for the sexual state, is a common environmental mold from the Phylum Ascomycota (Family Thermoascaceae). It is widespread in the environment and can be found in composts, soils and wood, as well as a common environmental contaminant in indoor air and carpet dust. Ascospores of the sexual state of P. variotii (B. spectabilis) are strongly heat-resistant. As such the fungus is a common contaminant of heat-treated foods and juices. Paecilomyces variotii has been associated with a number of infective diseases of humans and animals.

== Taxonomy ==
Paecilomyces variotii was first described by Georges Bainier in 1907, while its teleomorph was described in 1994 and ranked in Byssochlamys. P. variotii is closely related to P. brunneolus, P. formosus, P. divaricatus and P. dactylethromorphus.

== Morphology ==
Paecilomyces variotii is fast growing, producing powdery to suede-like colonies that are yellow-brown or sand-colored. It is distinguishable from microscopically similar microfungi, such as the biverticillate members of the genus Penicillium (affiliated with the genus Talaromyces) by its broadly ellipsoidal to lemon-shaped conidia, loosely branched conidiophores and phialides with pointed tips.

The colonies are usually flat, powdery to suede-like and funiculose or tufted. The color is initially white, and becomes yellow, yellow-brown, or sand-colored as they mature. A sweet aromatic odor may be associated with older cultures. Colonies of P. variotii are fast growing and mature within 3 days. Colonies grown on Sabouraud's dextrose agar reach about 7–8 mm after one week. Colonies on CYA are flat, floccose in texture, produce brown or olive brown from conidia, and range in diameter from 30 to 79 mmn in one week. Colonies on malt extract agar reach 70 mm diameter or more, otherwise very similar in appearance to those on CYA. Colonies on G25N media reach 8–16 mm diameter, similar to on CYA but with predominantly white mycelium. Microscopically, the spore-bearing structures of P. variotii consist of a loosely branched, irregularly brush-like conidiophores with phialides at the tips. The phialides are swollen at the base, and gradually taper to a sharp point at the tip. Conidia are single-celled, hyaline, and are borne in chains with the youngest at the base. Chlamydospores (thick-walled vegetative resting structures) are occasionally produced singly or in short chains.

The teleomorph of Paecilomyces variotii has also been described by the name Byssochlamys spectabilis. However, the Byssochlamys state is rarely observed in culture due to the heterothallic nature of this species (i.e., it requires culturing of positive and negative strains in co-culture to produce the teleomorph).

== Genetics ==
This fungus is heterothallic, and mating experiments have shown that P. variotii can form ascomata and ascospores in culture when compatible mating types are present.

The teleomorph of P. variotii, Byssochlamys spectabilis, is rarely observed in cultures from environmental or clinical specimens, which tend to be colonized by a single mating type. The genome sequences of two isolates of P. variotii of opposite mating type have been generated.

== Ecology ==
This species is thermophilic, able to grow at high temperatures as high as 50–60 °C. It can withstand brief exposures of up to 15 min at 80–100 °C. Accordingly, it typically causes spoilage of food products following pasteurization or other heat-treatments (e.g., curry sauces, fruit juices). It also has been reported as a contaminant in salami and margarine. The fungus is known from a number of non-food items including compost, rubber, glue, urea-formaldehyde foam insulation and creosote-treated wooden poles. The combination of its ability to survive significant heat stress and its ability to break-down aromatic hydrocarbons has led to interest in P. variotii as a potential candidate organism to assist in bioremediation.

It is also known from decaying wood and creosote-treated wood utility poles.

== Health significance ==
Although frequently encountered as a contaminant in clinical specimens, P. variotii is an uncommon causative agent of human and animal infections, but is considered to be an emerging agent of opportunistic disease, particularly in immunocompromised individuals. It has been suggested that the extremotolerant nature of the fungus contributes to its pathogenic potential. P. variotii is one of the most commonly encountered species in cases of cutaneous hyalohyphomycosis. Pneumonia due to P. variotii has been reported, albeit rarely, in the medical literature. Most cases are known from diabetics or individuals subject to long-term corticosteroid treatment for other diseases. P. variotii has also been reported as a causative agent of sinusitis, endophthalmitis, wound infection following tissue transplant, onychomycosis, osteomyelitis, otitis media and dialysis-related peritonitis. It has also been reported from mastitis in a goat, and as an agent of mycotic infections of dogs and horses. Besides clinical samples, the fungus is a common contaminant of moisture-damaged materials in the indoor environment including carpet, plaster and wood. It is commonly found in indoor air samples and may contribute to indoor allergy. This species produces the mycotoxin viriditoxin, via the action of six enzymes encoded within a cluster of genes within the genome.
