= Paecilomyces paravariotii =

Scientific classification
- Domain: Eukaryota
- Kingdom: Fungi
- Division: Ascomycota
- Class: Eurotiomycetes
- Order: Eurotiales
- Family: Thermoascaceae
- Genus: Paecilomyces
- Species: P. paravariotii

Binomial name
- Paecilomyces paravariotii Urquhart (2023)

Type strain
- FRR 5287

Species of fungus

Paecilomyces paravariotii is a species of fungus in the genus Paecilomyces in the order of Eurotiales, closely related to Paecilomyces variotii.
