= Penicillium flavidostipitatum =

Scientific classification
- Kingdom: Fungi
- Division: Ascomycota
- Class: Eurotiomycetes
- Order: Eurotiales
- Family: Aspergillaceae
- Genus: Penicillium
- Species: P. flavidostipitatum

Binomial name
- Penicillium flavidostipitatum C. Ramírez & C.C. González 1984

Type strain
- CBS 202.87, FRR 3309, IJFM 7824

Species of fungus

Penicillium flavidostipitatum is a species of the genus of Penicillium which produces patulin.

== See also ==
- List of Penicillium species
