= Penicillium neoechinulatum =

Scientific classification
- Kingdom: Fungi
- Division: Ascomycota
- Class: Eurotiomycetes
- Order: Eurotiales
- Family: Aspergillaceae
- Genus: Penicillium
- Species: P. neoechinulatum

Binomial name
- Penicillium neoechinulatum Frisvad, J.; Samson, R.A. 2004

Type strain
- ATCC 64186, CBS 101135, CBS 169.87, CMI 296937, IBT 21537, IBT 3493, IMI 296937, KCTC 6257, MUCL 4524, NRRL 13486, NRRL A-26897, NRRL A-27178

Synonyms
- Penicillium aurantiogriseum var. neoechinulatum

Species of fungus

Penicillium neoechinulatum is a species of fungus in the genus Penicillium which produces patulin.
