= Thermoascus aurantiacus =

Scientific classification
- Domain: Eukaryota
- Kingdom: Fungi
- Division: Ascomycota
- Class: Eurotiomycetes
- Order: Eurotiales
- Family: Thermoascaceae
- Genus: Thermoascus
- Species: T. aurantiacus

Binomial name
- Thermoascus aurantiacus Miehe (1907)

Species of fungus

Thermoascus aurantiacus is a species of fungus in the genus Thermoascus in the order of Eurotiales.
