= Thermoascus yaguchii =

Scientific classification
- Domain: Eukaryota
- Kingdom: Fungi
- Division: Ascomycota
- Class: Eurotiomycetes
- Order: Eurotiales
- Family: Thermoascaceae
- Genus: Thermoascus
- Species: T. yaguchii

Binomial name
- Thermoascus yaguchii Houbraken, Frisvad & Samson (2020)

Synonyms
- Coonemeria verrucosa (Yaguchi, Someya & Udagawa) Mouch. (1997); Thermoascus crustaceus var. verrucosus Yaguchi, Someya & Udagawa (1995)

Species of fungus

Thermoascus yaguchii is a species of fungus in the genus Thermoascus in the order of Eurotiales.
