= Penicillium jamesonlandense =

Scientific classification
- Kingdom: Fungi
- Division: Ascomycota
- Class: Eurotiomycetes
- Order: Eurotiales
- Family: Aspergillaceae
- Genus: Penicillium
- Species: P. jamesonlandense

Binomial name
- Penicillium jamesonlandense Frisvad & Overy 2006

Type strain
- CBS 102888, IBT 21984

Species of fungus

Penicillium jamesonlandense is a psychrotolerant species of the genus of Penicillium. Penicillium jamesonlandense produces patulin
