= Thermoascus isatschenkoi =

Scientific classification
- Domain: Eukaryota
- Kingdom: Fungi
- Division: Ascomycota
- Class: Eurotiomycetes
- Order: Eurotiales
- Family: Thermoascaceae
- Genus: Thermoascus
- Species: T. isatschenkoi

Binomial name
- Thermoascus isatschenkoi Malchevskaya (1939)

Species of fungus

Thermoascus isatschenkoi is a species of fungus in the genus Thermoascus in the order of Eurotiales.
