= Penicillium mononematosum =

Scientific classification
- Kingdom: Fungi
- Division: Ascomycota
- Class: Eurotiomycetes
- Order: Eurotiales
- Family: Aspergillaceae
- Genus: Penicillium
- Species: P. mononematosum

Binomial name
- Penicillium mononematosum Frisvad, J.C.; Filtenborg, O. 1989

Type strain
- CBS 172.87, IBT 21535, IMI 296925, NRRL 13482

Synonyms
- Penicillium glandicola var. mononematosum

Species of fungus

Penicillium mononematosum is an anamorph species of the genus Penicillium which produces viriditoxin.
