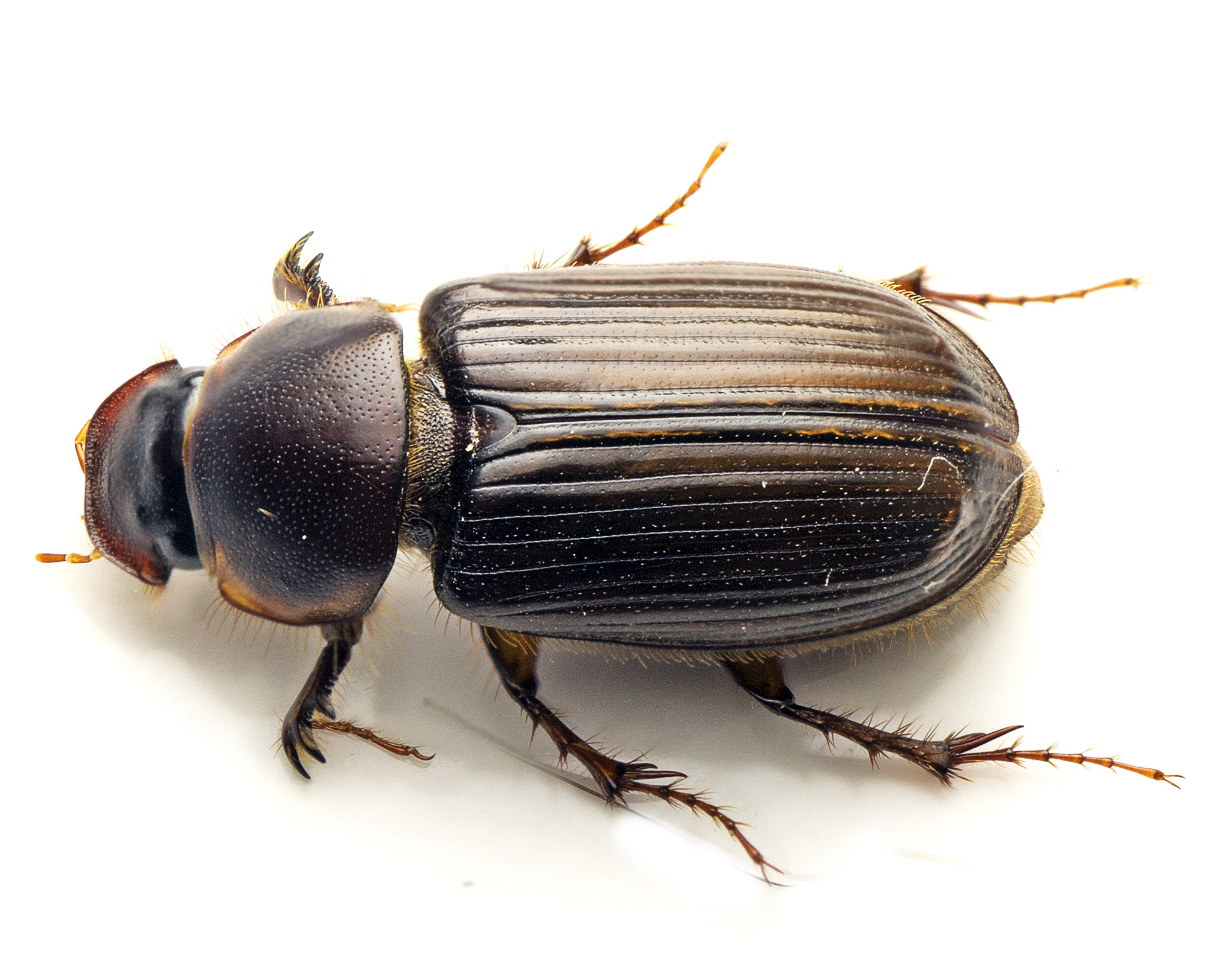

Scientific classification
- Kingdom: Animalia
- Phylum: Arthropoda
- Clade: Pancrustacea
- Class: Insecta
- Order: Coleoptera
- Suborder: Polyphaga
- Infraorder: Scarabaeiformia
- Family: Scarabaeidae
- Genus: Acrossidius
- Species: A. tasmaniae

Binomial name
- Acrossidius tasmaniae (Hope, 1847)
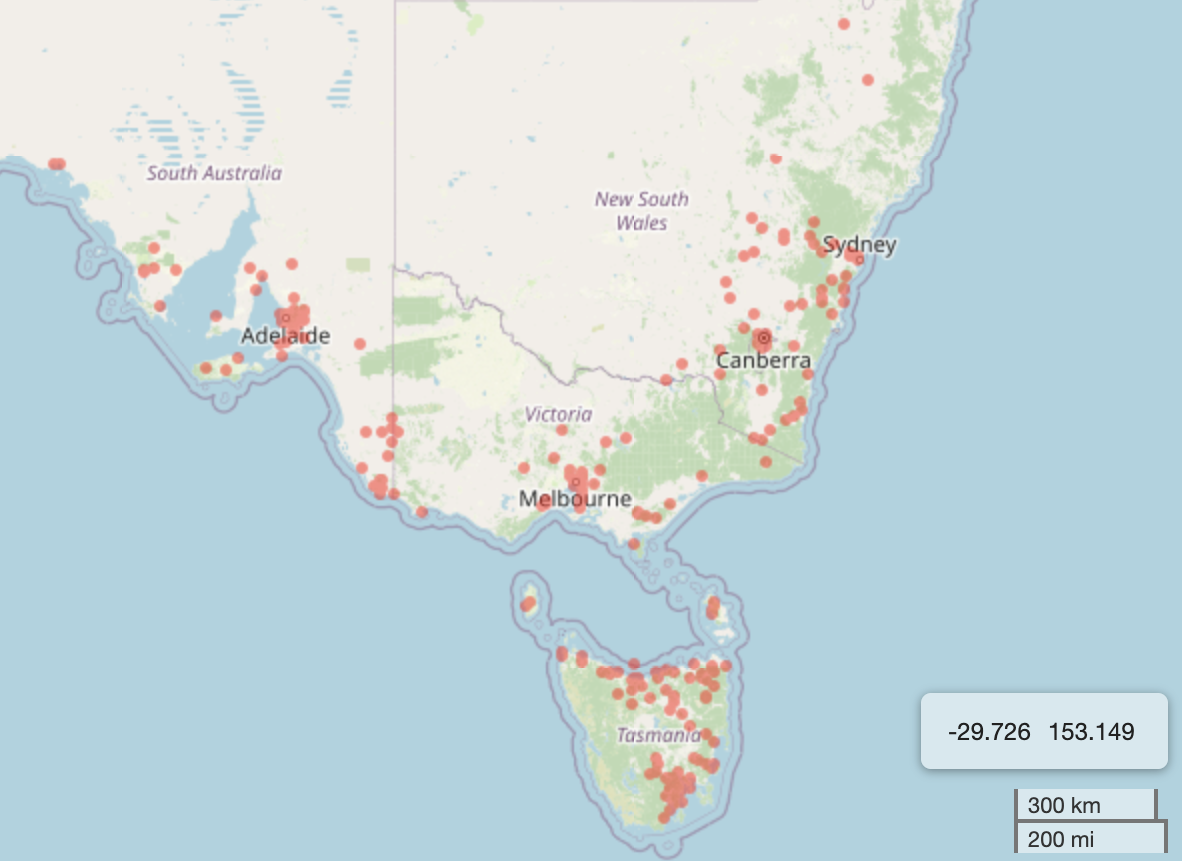
- Acrossidius tasmaniae distribution map.

Synonyms
- List: Aphodius pallidihirtus Balthasar, 1941; Aphodius andersoni Blackburn, 1941; Aphodius longitarsus Redtenbacher, 1867; Aphodius tasmaniae Hope, 1847; Aphodius howitti Hope, 1847; Aphodius australasiae Blanchard, 1846

= Acrossidius tasmaniae =

Species of scarab beetle

Acrossidius tasmaniae, the black-headed cockchafer or black-headed pasture cockchafer, also known as the Tasmanian grass grub, is a species of scarab beetle in the family Scarabaeidae. It is native to south-eastern Australia, occurring in Tasmania, Victoria, South Australia and New South Wales.

The species inhabits open grassy environments such as grasslands, pastures and lawns. Larvae feed on plant foliage and are considered an agricultural pest, causing severe damage to winter pastures and cereals when densely populated.

Acrossidius tasmaniae was introduced to New Zealand in the early 20th century, where it is regarded as a severe pest in dryland farming systems. The species has also been intercepted in Europe via international shipping. Despite its pest status, Acrossidius tasmaniae is an important food source for many species such as potoroid mammals, insectivorous birds, and parasitic wasps and flies.

== Description ==
=== Adults ===
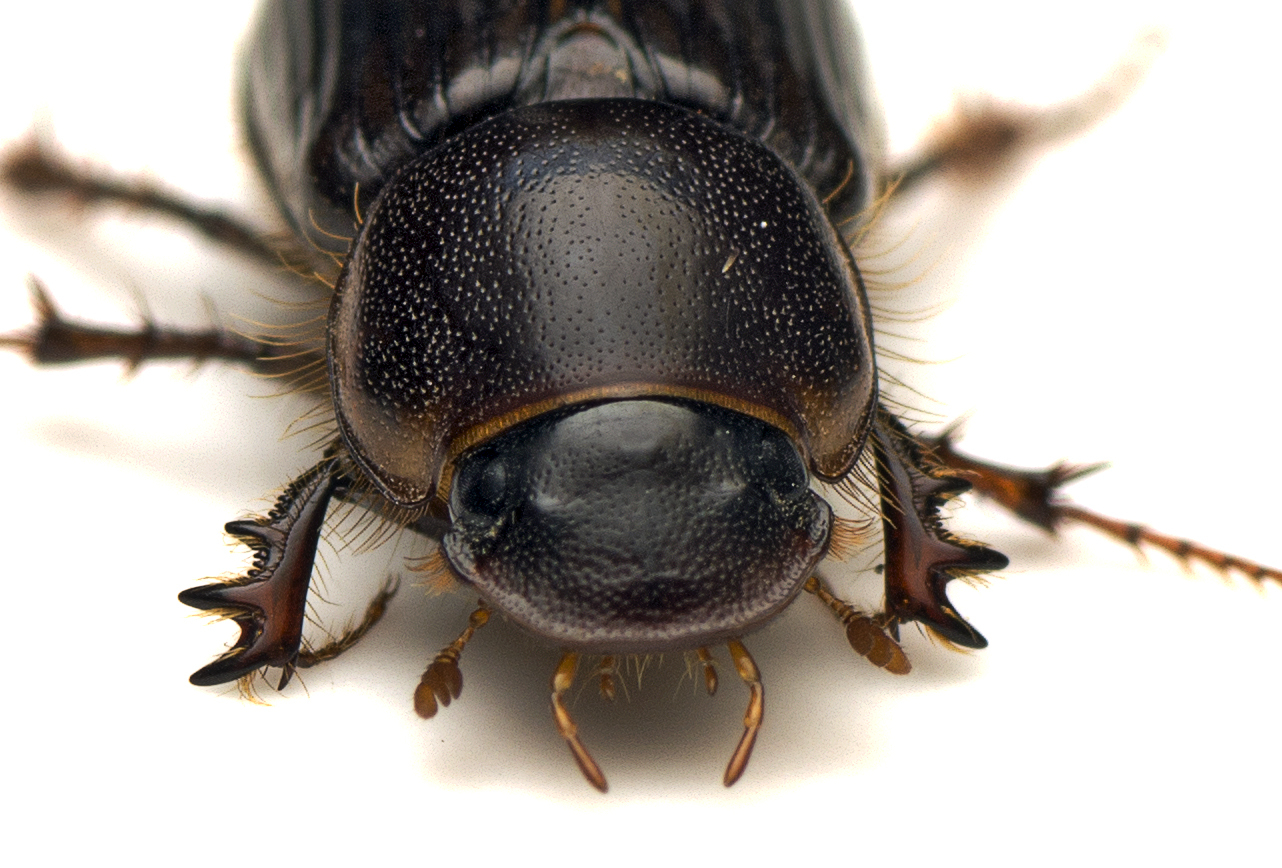
Adult close-up.

Adult beetles are 9 to 14 mm long, and 4 to 5.5 mm wide. The body colour is variable, and can be yellow, brown, or black. Geographic variation is expressed in colour. Specimens in higher altitudes are often darker, while specimens from lower areas are lighter. Their head is large with a distinct tubercle behind the frontal suture. Antennae are clubbed. Male heads are larger than those of females. Their pronotum is fringed with long, pale setae. In dark individuals the sides of their pronotum is lighter in colour. The legs are slender. Females lay cream-yellow eggs (2 mm in diameter) in clusters approximately 100 mm below the soil surface.

There are three other species of Acrossidius native to southern Australia: Acrossidius brittoni, Acrossidius pseudotasmaniae, and Acrossidius yorkensis. These species are poorly described and little is published regarding their differences to Acrossidius tasmaniae.

=== Larvae ===
Larvae are white or grey-white grubs with a large brown to black head capsule and six legs at the front of the body. At full length, they reach approximately 15 to 20 mm. They tend to curl into a 'C' shape when exposed or handled. The pupa is white, soft and approximately 10 mm in length.

== Life cycle ==
The Acrossidius tasmaniae life cycle lasts for one year. Beetles emerge from the soil in mid to late summer and live for several weeks. Adults are strongly attracted to lights and may form flying swarms which act to draw males and females together to mate. Flights are most common at dusk on calm, warm evenings. Females lay eggs in February which hatch after 3 to 4 weeks. Larvae initially feed on the soil humus before moving on to foliage. Larvae pass through three instars before reaching their full size in April to May, and cause the most feeding damage in their third instar. Larvae make vertical holes in the soil, remaining underground during the day and climbing up to feed at night. Larvae do not feed from spring until emergence while they undergo a prepupal, and subsequent pupal stage.

== Habitat and distribution ==
=== Distribution ===
Acrossidius tasmaniae is native to Tasmania, Victoria, South Australia, and New South Wales. Almost all grazing properties in Tasmania contain populations of either Acrossidius tasmaniae or Acrossidius pseudotasmaniae.

=== Habitat ===
Acrossidius tasmaniae have benefited from European settlement, commonly found in open grassy habitats such as grasslands, pasture and lawns. Females prefer to lay eggs in short (<3 cm), sparse pasture, often nearby objects such as trees or fencing. This is likely due to the adult beetles flying into the objects and laying eggs nearby.

Acrossidius tasmaniae prefer well-drained, light textured soils. They do not thrive in very sandy or heavy clay soils. It is common for populations to be present in well-drained crests and absent from nearby poorly-drained depressions. They are also moisture-sensitive, common in areas where the annual rainfall exceeds approximately 480 mm and below 1200 mm. While larvae are discouraged from feeding in very wet conditions, eggs and larvae will desiccate and die when the soil is too dry. Acrossidius tasmaniae are attracted to pastures with a high clover component. Dactylis glomerata and Festuca spp. have good tolerance against the larvae, and Phalaris is completely resistant to infestation.

== Ecology ==
=== Predators ===
Insectivorous birds such as Ibises, Australian magpies, and masked lapwings that frequent lawns and pasture are an important natural predator of Acrossidius tasmaniae. Mammals that feed on Acrossidius tasmaniae include bettongs, potoroos, bandicoots, and echidnas. Adult and larval stages of carabid beetles, and larval stages of click beetles also prey upon Acrossidius tasmaniae larvae.

=== Parasites ===
Parasitic scoliid and tiphiid wasps lay their eggs inside Acrossidius tasmaniae larvae, which hatch and feed on its body before pupating. Robber flies and tachinid flies also prey on both Acrossidius tasmaniae larvae and beetles. Eggs are laid on its body or in the soil, and the parasitic fly larvae feed on its body.

Acrossidius tasmaniae are susceptible to being attacked by the pathogenic fungi Cordyceps gunnii and Metarhizium spp. The fungus infects the larva to mummify it and produce a fruiting body from its body to the soil surface, forming spores that subsequently infect the next year's larvae. These fungi can greatly reduce Acrossidius tasmaniae population density.

== Pest status ==
=== Pest behaviour ===
Acrossidius tasmaniae are considered a pest as they are widespread on farm land. Larvae feed on pastoral species which reduces agricultural productivity and can exacerbate erosion.

Symptoms of infestation in pastures include plant thinning, bare batches in pasture, with low heaps of soil thrown up on the surface. Leaves may be pulled into soil tunnels that are around the diameter of a pencil. Unlike Oncopera intricata, larvae do not line their tunnels with silk. The presence of tunnels in heavily populated areas may make the soil feel spongy. This is most obvious in autumn to winter as larvae are most active.

=== Control ===
Control is warranted if Acrossidius tasmaniae exceed 30 per m², as this level of density can cause a 50-70% reduction in winter pasture and cereal production. The three main registered chemicals for control are alpha-cypermethrin, chlorpyrifos, and fenitrothion. The most effective time to spray is before anticipated rain after a dry spell. Only reasonable levels of control can be achieved with insecticides, and the most appropriate means for managing Acrossidius tasmaniae is yet to be determined. Non-chemical control measures include plowing before May, and maintaining good (>3 cm) pasture cover to deter females from laying eggs in the area.

== Non-native occurrences ==
=== New Zealand ===
Acrossidius tasmaniae was first found in New Zealand in 1916. Its distribution is limited to the northern North Island, Hawke's Bay, coastal Taranaki, Marlborough and the Canterbury Plains. Acrossidius tasmaniae is considered a severe threat to livestock farming on light soils and in dryland regions in New Zealand.

Four Acrossidius tasmaniae adults were recovered from the guts of six individual deep-sea fish species trawled off the coast of the North Island, New Zealand. This was the first occurrence of terrestrial arthropod in the diet of a deep-sea fish in New Zealand. It is speculated that the beetles were either trapped in trawling nets that were then deployed to catch the fish, or that the beetles were eaten by vertically migrating fish that were then consumed by deep-sea species.

=== Europe ===
In April 2013, four adult Acrossidius tasmaniae were found in Livorno, Italy, during inspection of a shipping container from New Zealand. This is the first interception of this species in Europe.
