= Penicillium formosanum =

Scientific classification
- Kingdom: Fungi
- Division: Ascomycota
- Class: Eurotiomycetes
- Order: Eurotiales
- Family: Aspergillaceae
- Genus: Penicillium
- Species: P. formosanum

Binomial name
- Penicillium formosanum Hsieh, H.M.; Su, H.J.; Tzean, S.S. 1987

Type strain
- CBS 101028, CBS 211.92, IBT 19748, IBT 21527

Species of fungus

Penicillium formosanum is a species of the genus of Penicillium which produces patulin and asteltoxin.

== See also ==
- List of Penicillium species
