= Thermoascus thermophilus =

Scientific classification
- Domain: Eukaryota
- Kingdom: Fungi
- Division: Ascomycota
- Class: Eurotiomycetes
- Order: Eurotiales
- Family: Thermoascaceae
- Genus: Thermoascus
- Species: T. thermophilus

Binomial name
- Thermoascus thermophilus (Sopp) Arx (1974)

Synonyms
- Dactylomyces thermophilus Sopp (1912); Penicillium thermophilum (Sopp) Sacc. (1931)

Species of fungus

Thermoascus thermophilus is a species of fungus in the genus Thermoascus in the order of Eurotiales.
