= Penicillium freii =

Scientific classification
- Domain: Eukaryota
- Kingdom: Fungi
- Division: Ascomycota
- Class: Eurotiomycetes
- Order: Eurotiales
- Family: Aspergillaceae
- Genus: Penicillium
- Species: P. freii

Binomial name
- Penicillium freii Lund, F.; Frisvad, J.C. 1994

Species of fungus

Penicillium freii is a psychrophilic species of the genus of Penicillium which produces xanthomegnin and patulin. Penicillium freii occurs in meat, meat products, barley and wheat

== See also ==
- List of Penicillium species
