= Paecilomyces lagunculariae =

Scientific classification
- Domain: Eukaryota
- Kingdom: Fungi
- Division: Ascomycota
- Class: Eurotiomycetes
- Order: Eurotiales
- Family: Thermoascaceae
- Genus: Paecilomyces
- Species: P. lagunculariae

Binomial name
- Paecilomyces lagunculariae (C. Ram) Houbraken, Frisvad & Samson (2020)

Synonyms
- Byssochlamys lagunculariae (C. Ram) Samson, Houbraken & Frisvad (2009); Byssochlamys nivea var. lagunculariae C. Ram (1968)

Species of fungus

Paecilomyces lagunculariae is a species of fungus in the genus Paecilomyces in the order of Eurotiales.
