= Aspergillus aureoluteus =

Scientific classification
- Kingdom: Fungi
- Division: Ascomycota
- Class: Eurotiomycetes
- Order: Eurotiales
- Family: Aspergillaceae
- Genus: Aspergillus
- Species: A. aureoluteus

Binomial name
- Aspergillus aureoluteus Samson & W. Gams (1985)

Synonyms
- Neosartorya aureola

Species of fungus

Aspergillus aureoluteus (also known as Neosartorya aureola) is a species of fungus in the genus Aspergillus. It is from the Fumigati section. The species was first described in 1985. It has been reported to produce fumagillin, tryptoquivaline, tryptoquivalone, pseurotin A, and viriditoxin.

== Growth and morphology ==
A. aureoluteus has been cultivated on both Czapek yeast extract agar (CYA) plates and Malt Extract Agar Oxoid® (MEAOX) plates. The growth morphology of the colonies can be seen in the pictures below.

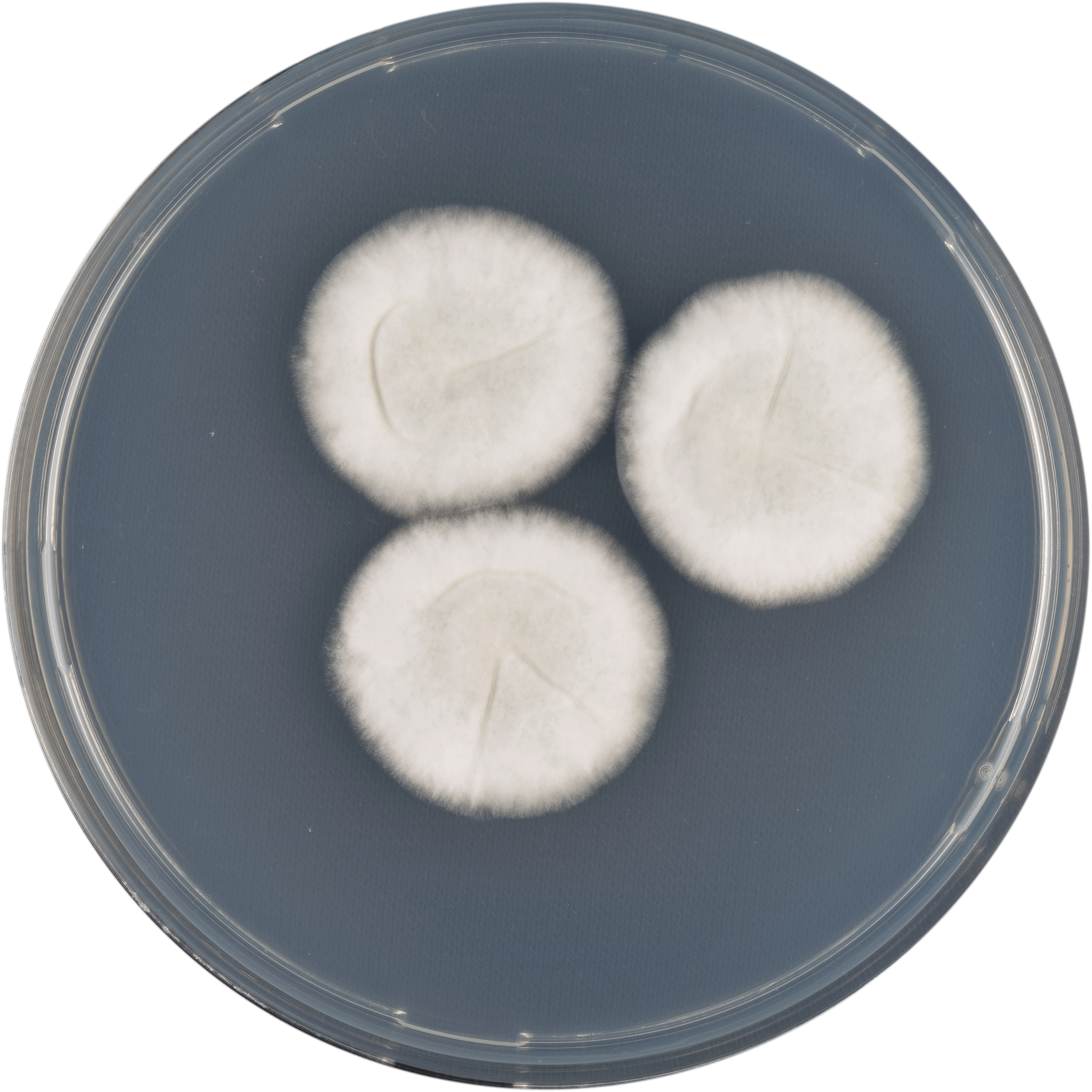
Aspergillus aureoluteus growing on CYA plate

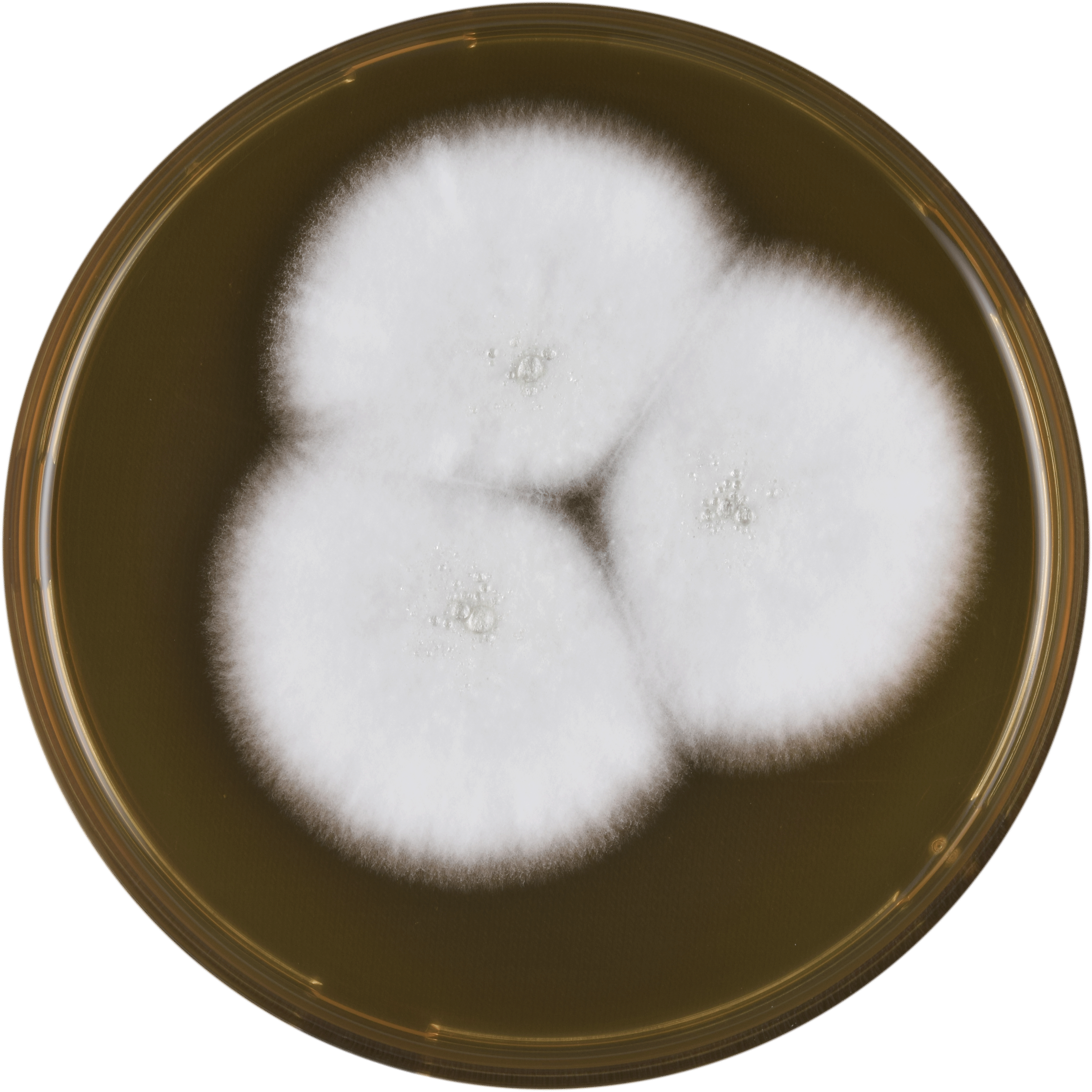
Aspergillus aureoluteus growing on MEAOX plate
