= Paecilomyces formosus =

Scientific classification
- Domain: Eukaryota
- Kingdom: Fungi
- Division: Ascomycota
- Class: Eurotiomycetes
- Order: Eurotiales
- Family: Thermoascaceae
- Genus: Paecilomyces
- Species: P. formosus

Binomial name
- Paecilomyces formosus Urquhart (2023)

Synonyms
- Monilia formosa Sakag., May. Inoue & Tada (1939); Paecilomyces formosa Sakag., May. Inoue & Tada ex Houbraken & Samson (2009); Paecilomyces formosus Sakag., May. Inoue & Tada ex Houbraken & Samson (2009)

Species of fungus

Paecilomyces formosus is a species of fungus in the genus Paecilomyces in the order of Eurotiales.

== History ==
The genus Paecilomyces formosus was first introduced in 2009 as species name for the anamorph form of Monilia formosa, ranked in Monilinia, originally described in 1939. Due to an invalid original description of M. formosa, the name P. formosus was also considered invalid. In the process of reclassification of fungi following adaptation of the "One fungus, one name" principle, it was suggested to be a synonym of P. maximus. In 2023, whole genome sequencing allowed a proper description of P. formosus, clearly distinct to P. maximus and P. lecythidis.
