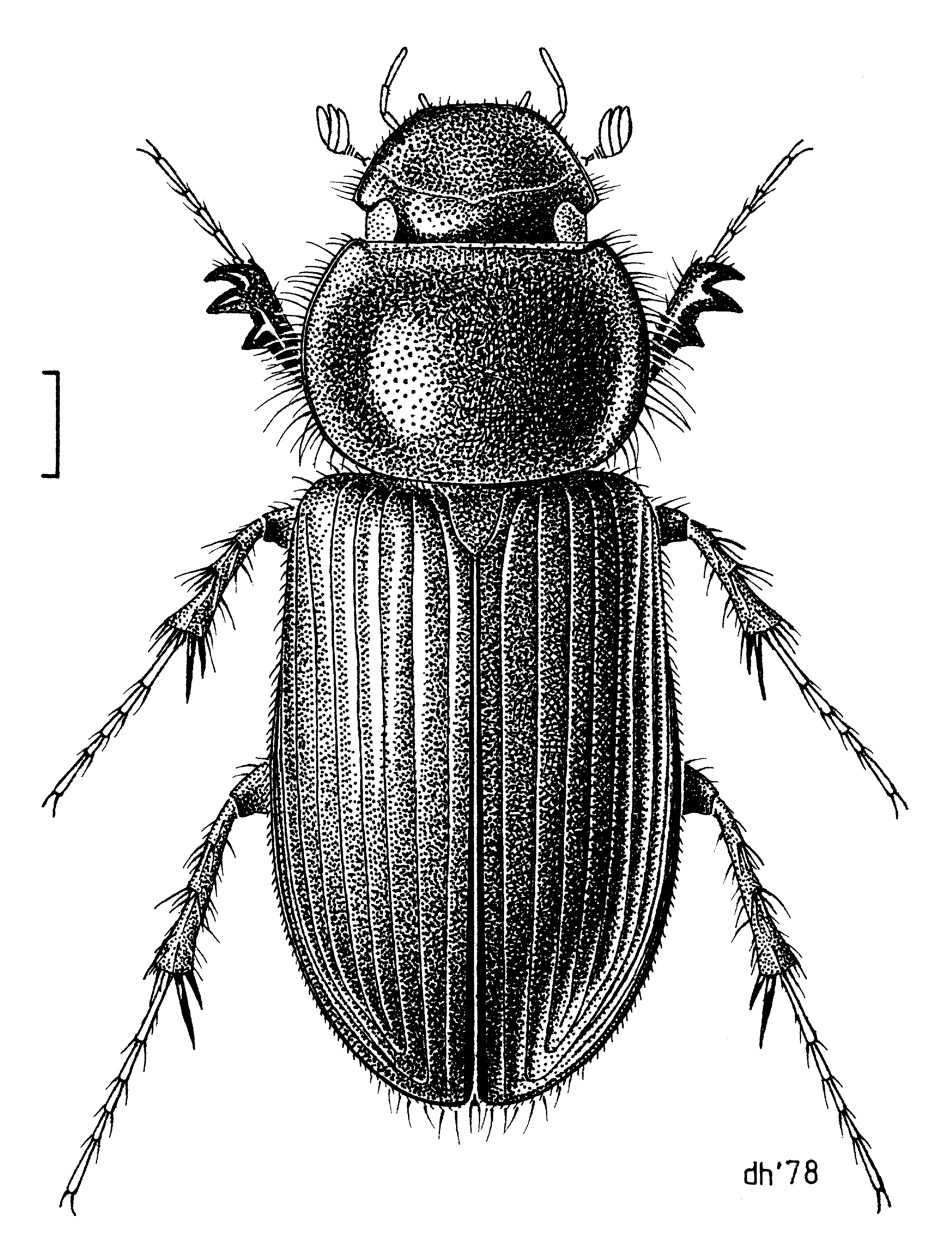
- Acrossidius tasmaniae

Scientific classification
- Kingdom: Animalia
- Phylum: Arthropoda
- Clade: Pancrustacea
- Class: Insecta
- Order: Coleoptera
- Suborder: Polyphaga
- Infraorder: Scarabaeiformia
- Family: Scarabaeidae
- Subfamily: Aphodiinae
- Tribe: Aphodiini
- Genus: Acrossidius; Schmidt, 1913

= Acrossidius =

Genus of beetles

Acrossidius is a genus of beetles belonging to the family Scarabaeidae.

The two species are native to Southern Australia. Acrossidius tasmaniae, the black-headed cockchafer or Tasmanian grass grub, is introduced to New Zealand.

Species:

- Acrossidius pseudotasmaniae (Given, 1950)
- Acrossidius tasmaniae (Hope, 1846)
