= Aspergillus brevipes =

Scientific classification
- Kingdom: Fungi
- Division: Ascomycota
- Class: Eurotiomycetes
- Order: Eurotiales
- Family: Aspergillaceae
- Genus: Aspergillus
- Species: A. brevipes

Binomial name
- Aspergillus brevipes G. Smith 1952

Type strain
- ATCC 16899, CBS 118.53, IFO 5821, IMI 51494, LSHBBB 263, LSHBSm 242, NRRL 2439, QM 1948

Varieties
- Aspergillus brevipes var. unilateralis

Species of fungus

Aspergillus brevipes is an anamorph species of fungus in the genus Aspergillus. It is from the Fumigati section. It was first described in 1952. It has been isolated from soil in Australia. Aspergillus brevipes produces roquefortine C, meleagrin and viriditoxin.

== Growth and morphology ==
A. brevipes has been cultivated on both Czapek yeast extract agar (CYA) plates and Malt Extract Agar Oxoid® (MEAOX) plates. The growth morphology of the colonies can be seen in the pictures below.

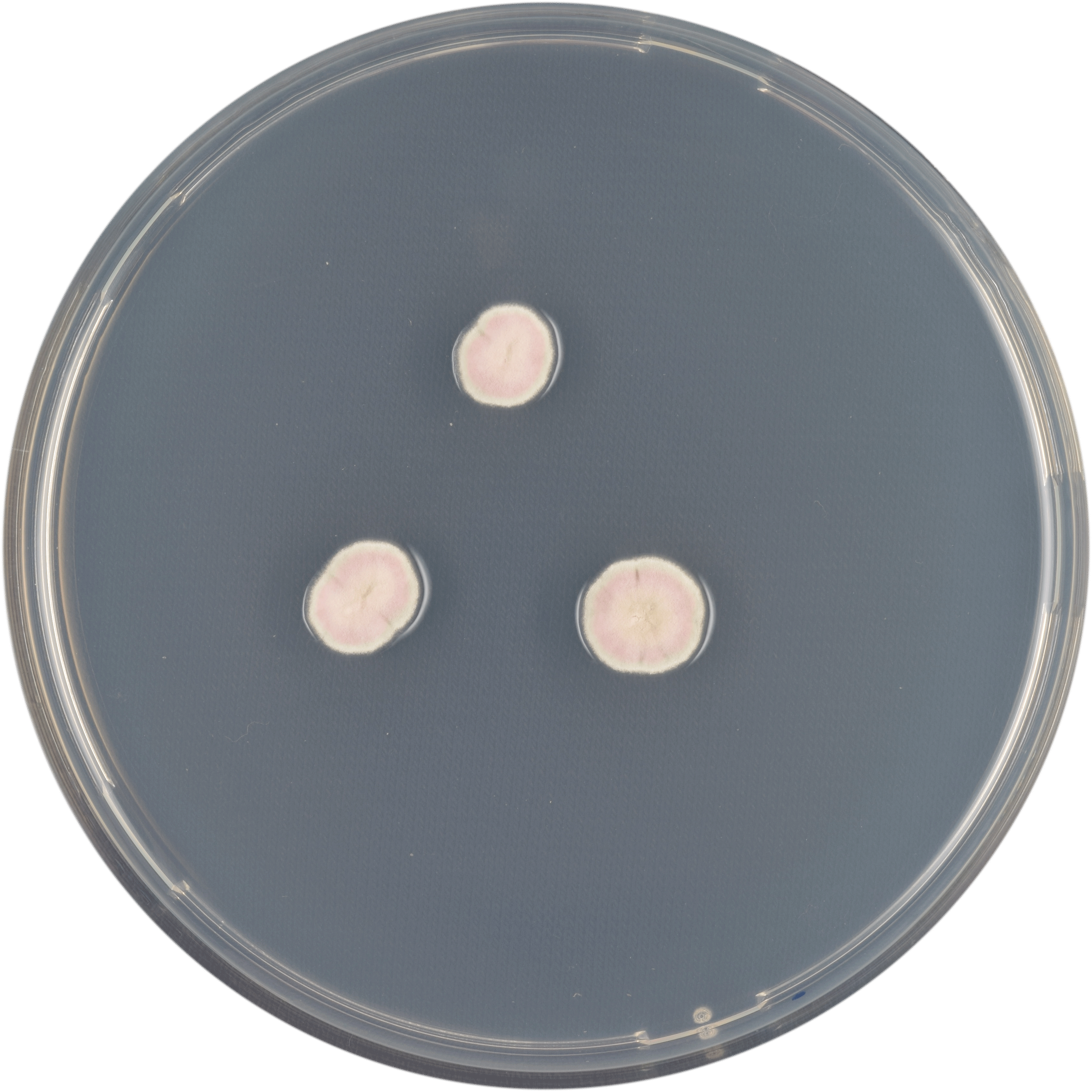
Aspergillus brevipes growing on CYA plate

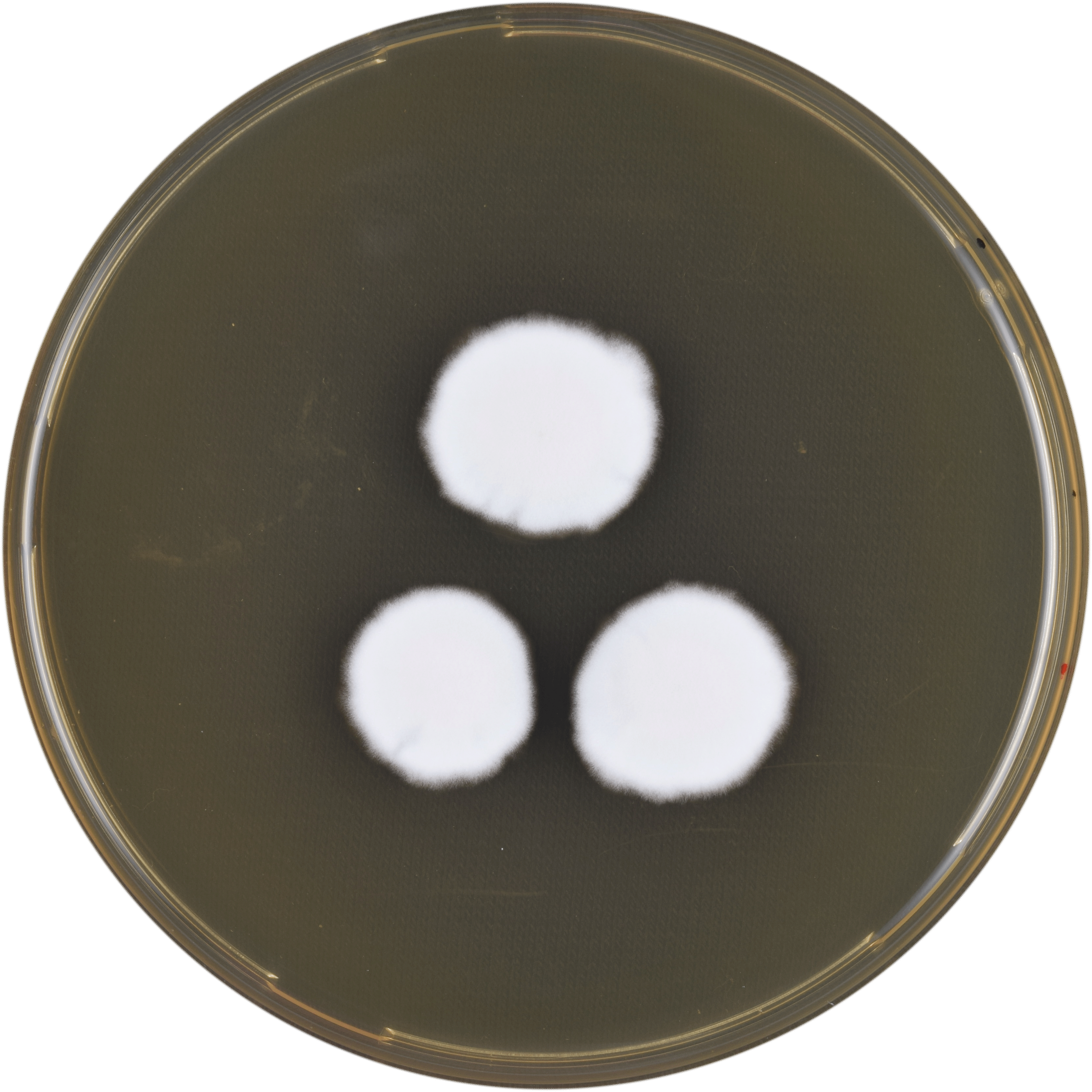
Aspergillus brevipes growing on MEAOX plate
