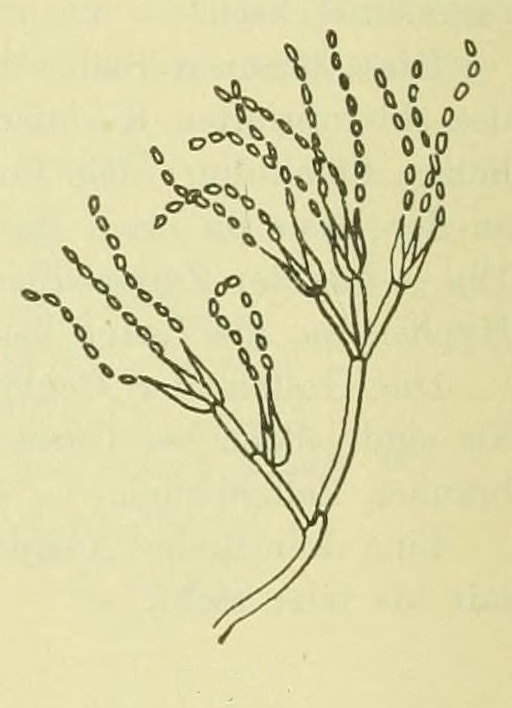
- Illustration of Isaria fumosorosea by Casimir Wize.

Scientific classification
- Kingdom: Fungi
- Division: Ascomycota
- Class: Sordariomycetes
- Order: Hypocreales
- Family: Cordycipitaceae
- Genus: Isaria
- Species: I. fumosorosea

Binomial name
- Isaria fumosorosea Wize (1904)

Synonyms
- Paecilomyces fumosoroseus (Wize) A.H.S. Br. & G. Sm. (1957); Spicaria fumosorosea (Wize) Vassiljevsky (1929)

= Isaria fumosorosea =

Species of fungus

Isaria fumosorosea is an entomopathogenic fungus, formerly known as Paecilomyces fumosoroseus. It shows promise as a biological pesticide with an extensive host range.

== Life cycle ==
When a conidium or blastospore of Isaria fumosorosea lands on a suitable host, it produces enzymes to penetrate the insect's cuticle. A germ tube then grows into the haemocoel and the fungus proliferates inside the insect’s body. The fungus can also enter through the spiracles, the mouth or the anal opening. The mycelia spread in the haemolymph and tissues, eventually emerging from the insect and producing conidia. Mortality of the insect has been ascribed to the drainage of its nutrients, the destruction of its tissues and the release of toxins.

== Host range ==
This fungus has a wide host range that includes insects in over twenty five different families and many species of mite. Agricultural pest insects which are susceptible to infection include the diamondback moth (Plutella xyllostella), the Russian wheat aphid (Diuraphis noxia) and the silverleaf whitefly (Bemisia argentifolii). Among mites, susceptible species include the spotted spider mite (Tetranychus urticae), the European red mite (Panonychus ulmi), the brown mite (Byrobia rubrioculus) and the apple rust mite (Aculus schlectendali).

== Use in biological control ==
Isaria fumosorosea has been used to control insect pests of plants grown for the production of cut flowers, ornamentals growing in greenhouses and nurseries, vegetable and cole crops, cotton, maize, rice and plantation crops.

It has also been found to reduce the development and spread of powdery mildew, Podosphaera xanthii complex (formerly Sphaerotheca fuliginea), on cucumbers.

A comparison made between several entomopathogenic hyphomycetes showed that Isaria fumosorosea (as Paecilomyces fumosoroseus) provided more effective control of the cabbage-heart caterpillar, Crocidolomia binotalis, than did either Beauveria bassiana or Metarhizium anisopliae.

Research at the USDA-ARS Bioactive Agents Research Unit in Peoria showed that blastospores start germinating at a faster rate on the cuticle of silverleaf whiteflies than do conidia. This suggests that the use of blastospores rather than conidia for the development of formulations would be advantageous.

The fungus neither grows nor develops at temperatures above 32 °C and is not thought to be pathogenic to humans. It has not been found to be toxic to rats in laboratory experiments and is not considered to be harmful to birds, honey bees, bumblebees or a wide range of non-target arthropods.
