= Acrossidius pseudotasmaniae =

Scientific classification
- Kingdom: Animalia
- Phylum: Arthropoda
- Clade: Pancrustacea
- Class: Insecta
- Order: Coleoptera
- Suborder: Polyphaga
- Infraorder: Scarabaeiformia
- Family: Scarabaeidae
- Genus: Acrossidius
- Species: A. pseudotasmaniae

Binomial name
- Acrossidius pseudotasmaniae (Given, 1950)

Synonyms
- Aphodius pseudotasmaniae Given, 1950

Species of beetle

Acrossidius pseudotasmaniae, the blackheaded pasture cockchafer or Tasmanian grass grub, is a species of beetle of the family Scarabaeidae. It is found in Australia (Tasmania).

== Description ==
Adults reach a length of about 9–13 mm (0.35–0.51 in). They are yellowish brown, reddish brown or brownish black. In dark specimens the sides of the pronotum are lighter.
