= Aspergillus viridinutans =

Scientific classification
- Kingdom: Fungi
- Division: Ascomycota
- Class: Eurotiomycetes
- Order: Eurotiales
- Family: Aspergillaceae
- Genus: Aspergillus
- Species: A. viridinutans

Binomial name
- Aspergillus viridinutans Ducker & Thrower (1954)

Species of fungus

Aspergillus viridinutans is a species of fungus in the genus Aspergillus. The species was first isolated in Frankston, Victoria, Australia and described in 1954. It is from the Fumigati section of Aspergillus. Several fungi from this section produce heat-resistant ascospores, and the isolates from this section are frequently obtained from locations where natural fires have previously occurred. A. viridinutans has been identified as the cause of chronic aspergillosis. The mycotoxin viriditoxin was first identified in A. viridinutans. A draft genome sequence of the strain derived from the original species description has been generated.

== Growth and morphology ==
A. viridinutans can be cultivated on different medium sources, including both Czapek yeast extract agar (CYA) plates and Malt Extract Agar Oxoid® (MEAOX) plates. The growth morphology of colonies can be seen in the pictures below.

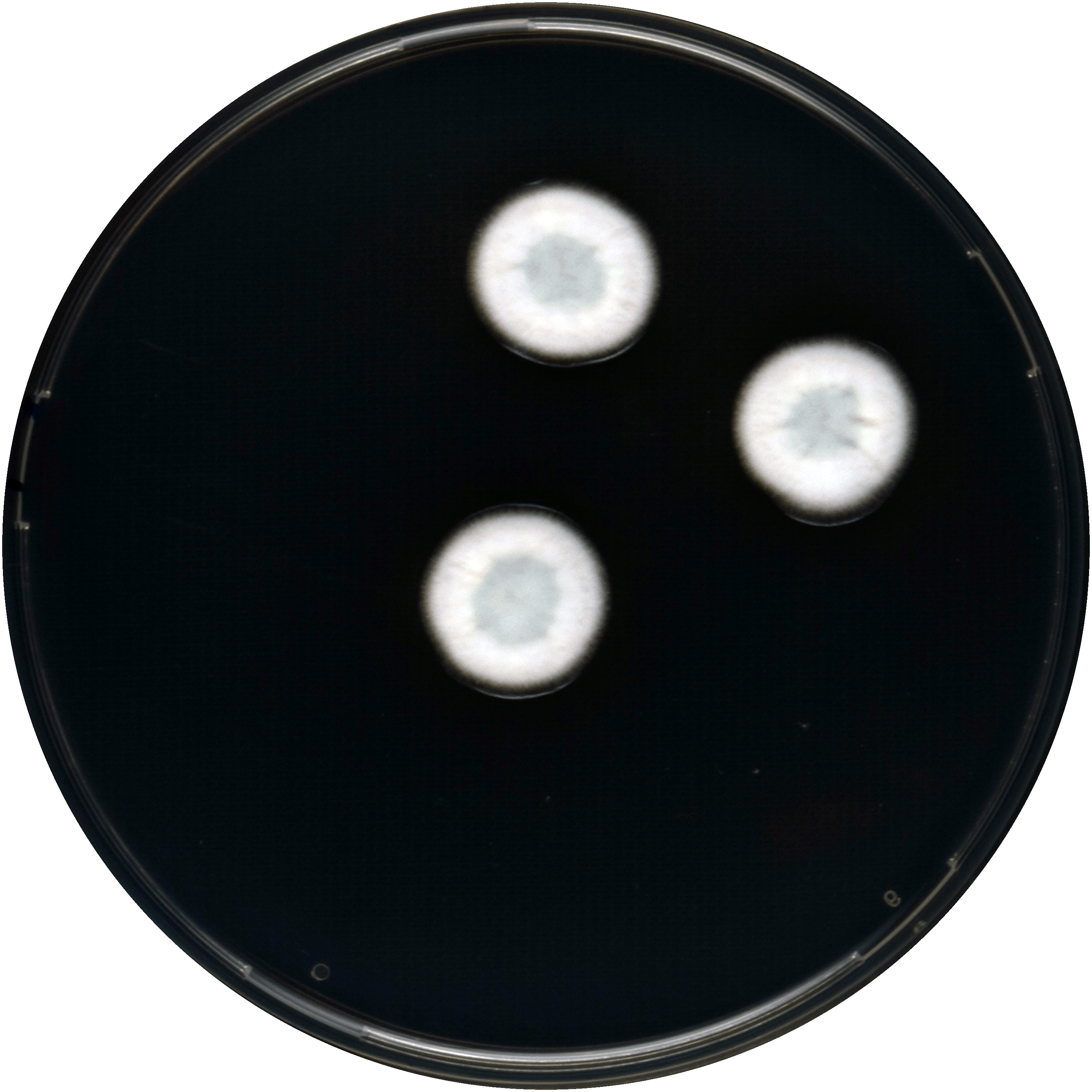
Aspergillus viridinutans growing on CYA plate

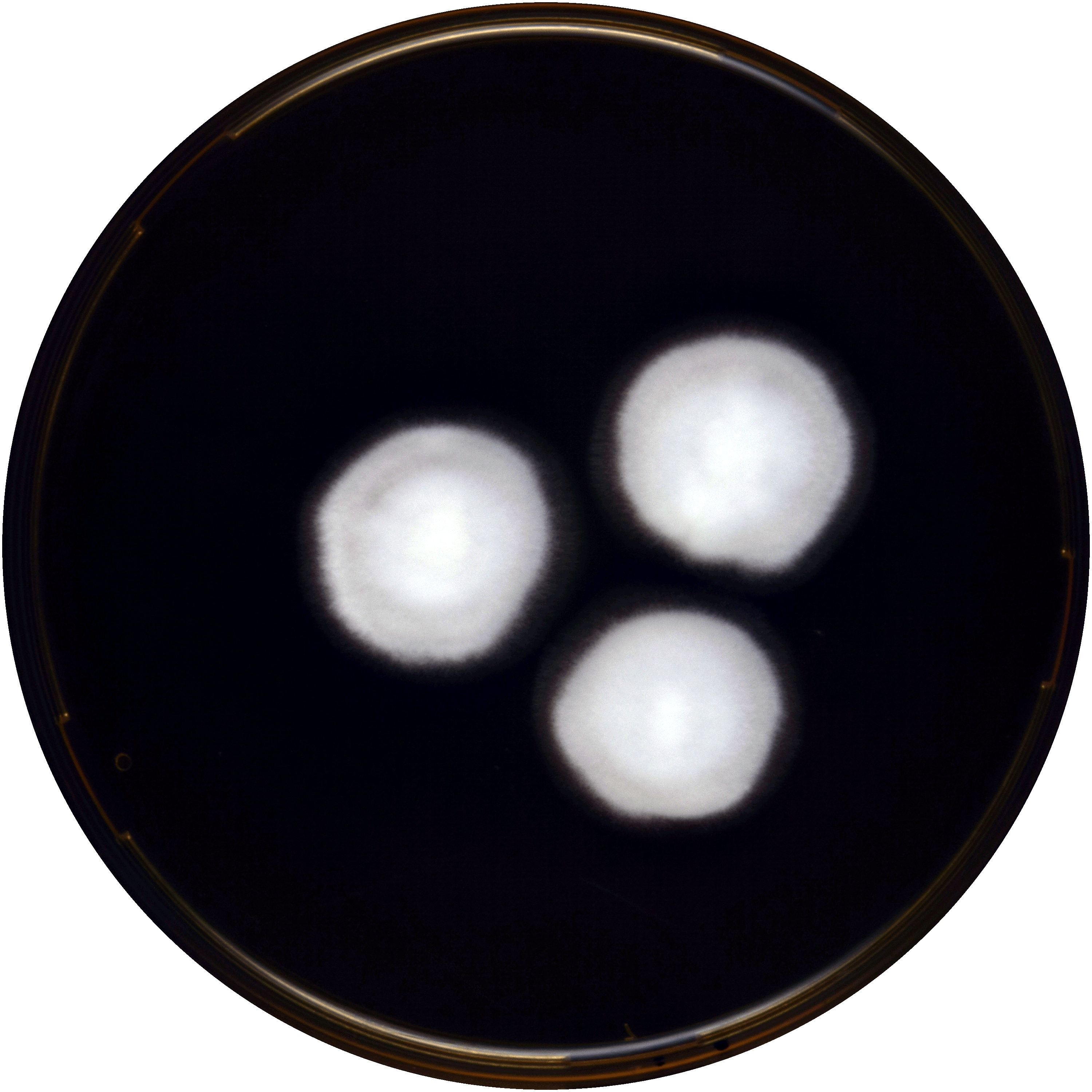
Aspergillus viridinutans growing on MEAOX plate
