= Thermoascus crustaceus =

Scientific classification
- Domain: Eukaryota
- Kingdom: Fungi
- Division: Ascomycota
- Class: Eurotiomycetes
- Order: Eurotiales
- Family: Thermoascaceae
- Genus: Thermoascus
- Species: T. crustaceus

Binomial name
- Thermoascus crustaceus (Apinis & Chesters) Stolk (1965)

Synonyms
- Coonemeria crustacea (Apinis & Chesters) Mouch. (1997); Paecilomyces crustaceus (Apinis & Chesters) Yaguchi, Someya & Udagawa. (1995)

Species of fungus

Thermoascus crustaceus is a species of fungus in the genus Thermoascus in the order of Eurotiales.
