= Thermoascus verrucosus =

Scientific classification
- Domain: Eukaryota
- Kingdom: Fungi
- Division: Ascomycota
- Class: Eurotiomycetes
- Order: Eurotiales
- Family: Thermoascaceae
- Genus: Thermoascus
- Species: T. verrucosus

Binomial name
- Thermoascus verrucosus (Samson & Tansey) Houbraken, Frisvad & Samson (2020)

Synonyms
- Byssochlamys verrucosa Samson & Tansey (1975)

Species of fungus

Thermoascus verrucosus is a species of fungus in the genus Thermoascus in the order of Eurotiales.
