= Paecilomyces fulvus =

Scientific classification
- Domain: Eukaryota
- Kingdom: Fungi
- Division: Ascomycota
- Class: Eurotiomycetes
- Order: Eurotiales
- Family: Thermoascaceae
- Genus: Paecilomyces
- Species: P. fulvus

Binomial name
- Paecilomyces fulvus Stolk & E.S. Salmon (1971)

Synonyms
- Byssochlamys fulva (1971) Olliver & G. Sm. (1933)

Species of fungus

Paecilomyces fulvus is a plant pathogen that causes Byssochlamys rot on strawberries.
