= Thermoascus taitungiacus =

Scientific classification
- Domain: Eukaryota
- Kingdom: Fungi
- Division: Ascomycota
- Class: Eurotiomycetes
- Order: Eurotiales
- Family: Thermoascaceae
- Genus: Thermoascus
- Species: T. taitungiacus

Binomial name
- Thermoascus taitungiacus K.Y. Chen & Z.C. Chen (1996)

Synonyms
- Paecilomyces taitungiacus

Species of fungus

Thermoascus taitungiacus is a species of fungus in the genus Thermoascus in the order of Eurotiales.
