= Thermoascus aegyptiacus =

Scientific classification
- Domain: Eukaryota
- Kingdom: Fungi
- Division: Ascomycota
- Class: Eurotiomycetes
- Order: Eurotiales
- Family: Thermoascaceae
- Genus: Thermoascus
- Species: T. aegyptiacus

Binomial name
- Thermoascus aegyptiacus S. Ueda & Udagawa (1983)

Synonyms
- Coonemeria aegyptiaca (S. Ueda & Udagawa) Mouch. (1997); Coonemeria egyptiacus; Thermoascus egyptiacus; Paecilomyces aegyptiacus S. Ueda & Udagawa (1983); Paecilomyces egyptiacus

Species of fungus

Thermoascus aegyptiacus is a species of fungus in the genus Thermoascus in the order of Eurotiales.

== Taxonomy ==
Before adaptation of the "one fungus - one name" rule, Paecilomyces aegyptiacus referred to the anamorph, while T. aegyptiacus and briefly Coonemeria aegyptiaca referred to the teleomorph.
