= Paecilomyces dactylethromorphus =

Scientific classification
- Domain: Eukaryota
- Kingdom: Fungi
- Division: Ascomycota
- Class: Eurotiomycetes
- Order: Eurotiales
- Family: Thermoascaceae
- Genus: Paecilomyces
- Species: P. dactylethromorphus

Binomial name
- Paecilomyces dactylethromorphus Batista & H. Maia (1957)

Synonyms
- Paecilomyces mandshuricus var. saturatus Nakaz., Y. Takeda & Suematsu (1934); Paecilomyces saturatus (Nakaz., Y. Takeda & Suematsu) Samson & Houbraken (2009); Paecilomyces viniferum Sakag., Inoue & Tada (1939)

Species of fungus

Paecilomyces dactylethromorphus is a species of fungus in the genus Paecilomyces in the order of Eurotiales.
