= Paecilomyces niveus =

Scientific classification
- Domain: Eukaryota
- Kingdom: Fungi
- Division: Ascomycota
- Class: Eurotiomycetes
- Order: Eurotiales
- Family: Thermoascaceae
- Genus: Paecilomyces
- Species: P. niveus

Binomial name
- Paecilomyces niveus Stolk & Samson (1971)

Synonyms
- Arachniotus trisporus Hotson (1936); Byssochlamys trisporus (Hotson) Cain (1956); Byssochlamys nivea Westling (1909); Gymnoascus sudans Vailionis (1936)

Species of fungus

Paecilomyces niveus is a species of fungus in the genus Paecilomyces in the order of Eurotiales.
