= Thermoascus =

Scientific classification
- Kingdom: Fungi
- Division: Ascomycota
- Class: Eurotiomycetes
- Order: Eurotiales
- Family: Thermoascaceae
- Genus: Thermoascus; Bainier (1907)

Type species
- Thermoascus aurantiacus Miehe (1907)

Species
- T. aegyptiacus T. aurantiacus T. crustaceus T. taitungiacus T. thermophilus T. verrucosus T. yaguchii

Genus of soil fungi

Thermoascus is a genus of soil fungi in the family Trichocomaceae. Species in the genus are characterized by the production of heat-resistant ascospores. Thermoascus was circumscribed by German botanist Hugo Miehe in 1907.

The type species, Thermoascus aurantiacus, is of research interest because it secretes heat-resistant hydrolase enzymes that could possibly be used in biotechnological applications, such as the conversion of biomass to biofuels. Genetic tools have been developed to genetically edit Thermoascus aurantiacus, such as an Agrobacterium tumefaciens-mediated transformation protocol and a CRISPR-Cas9 gene editing system, which have been used to overexpress genes that correspond to production of enzymes that break down plant matter and inactivate genes.

== Species ==
- Thermoascus aegyptiacus S. Ueda & Udagawa (1983)
- Thermoascus aurantiacus Miehe (1907)
- Thermoascus crustaceus (Apinis & Chesters) Stolk (1965)
- Thermoascus taitungiacus K.Y.Chen & Z.C.Chen (1996)
- Thermoascus thermophilus (Sopp) Arx (1970)
- Thermoascus verrucosus (Samson & Tansey) Houbraken, Frisvad & Samson (2020)
- Thermoascus yaguchii (Samson & Tansey) Houbraken, Frisvad & Samson (2020)

Another described species, Thermoascus isatschenkoi Malchevskaya (1939), is considered doubtful due to a lack of examinable material and an incomprehensive description.
