= Penicillium ehrlichii =

Scientific classification
- Kingdom: Fungi
- Division: Ascomycota
- Class: Eurotiomycetes
- Order: Eurotiales
- Family: Aspergillaceae
- Genus: Penicillium
- Species: P. ehrlichii

Binomial name
- Penicillium ehrlichii Klebahn (1930)

Synonyms
- Eupenicillium ehrlichii (Kleb.) Stolk & D.B. Scott (1967); Paecilomyces ehrlichii (Kleb.) Delitsch & Henneberg (1943); Penicillium lebahnii Pitt (1980)

Species of fungus

Penicillium ehrlichii is a species of fungus in the genus Penicillium in the order of Eurotiales. In Penicillium, it is placed in the series Janthinella in the section Lanata-Divaricata.
