= Valsonectria =

Scientific classification
- Kingdom: Fungi
- Division: Ascomycota
- Class: Sordariomycetes
- Order: Hypocreales
- Family: Bionectriaceae
- Genus: Valsonectria; Speg.

Type species
- Valsonectria pulchella Speg.

Genus of fungi

Valsonectria is a genus of fungi in the class Sordariomycetes. It consists of six species.
