= Evansstolkia =

Scientific classification
- Domain: Eukaryota
- Kingdom: Fungi
- Division: Ascomycota
- Class: Eurotiomycetes
- Order: Eurotiales
- Family: Aspergillaceae
- Genus: Evansstolkia
- Species: E. leycettana

Binomial name
- Evansstolkia leycettana (H.C. Evans & Stolk) Houbraken, Frisvad & Samson (2020)

Synonyms
- Paecilomyces leycettanus (H.C.Evans & Stolk) Stolk, Samson & H.C.Evans (1972); Penicillium leycettanum H.C.Evans & Stolk (1971); Talaromyces leycettanus H.C.Evans & Stolk (1971)

Genus of fungi

Evansstolkia leycettana is a species of fungus in the monotypic genus Evansstolkia in the order of Eurotiales.
