= Pseudohamigera striata =

Scientific classification
- Domain: Eukaryota
- Kingdom: Fungi
- Division: Ascomycota
- Class: Eurotiomycetes
- Order: Eurotiales
- Family: Aspergillaceae
- Genus: Pseudohamigera
- Species: P. striata

Binomial name
- Pseudohamigera striata (Raper & Fennell) Houbraken, Frisvad & Samson (2020)

Synonyms
- Byssochlamys striata (Raper & Fennell) Arx (1986); Hamigera striata (Raper & Fennell) Stolk & Samson (1971); Penicillium striatum Raper & Fennell (1948); Talaromyces striatus (Raper & Fennell) C.R. Benj (1955)

Species of fungus

Pseudohamigera striata is a species of fungus in the genus Pseudohamigera in the order of Eurotiales.
