= Viriditoxin =

Names
- Other names (-)-Viriditoxin (M)-Viriditoxin

Identifiers
CAS Number	35483-50-2
3D model (JSmol)	Interactive image
ChEBI	CHEBI:146007
ChemSpider	58828231
PubChem CID	53343291
UNII	6TAK972FMC
CompTox Dashboard (EPA)	DTXSID70956888
- InChI: InChI=1S/C34H30O14/c1-43-21-11-19(35)27-17(7-13-5-15(9-23(37)45-3)47-33(41)25(13)31(27)39)29(21)30-18-8-14-6-16(10-24(38)46-4)48-34(42)26(14)32(40)28(18)20(36)12-22(30)44-2/h7-8,11-12,15-16,35-36,39-40H,5-6,9-10H2,1-4H3/t15-,16-/m0/s1 Key: GMCZVCXZGZGZPX-HOTGVXAUSA-N
- SMILES: COc1cc(c2c(c1c3c4cc5c(c(c4c(cc3OC)O)O)C(=O)O[C@@H](C5)CC(=O)OC)cc6c(c2O)C(=O)O[C@@H](C6)CC(=O)OC)O
- Except where otherwise noted, data are given for materials in their standard state (at 25 °C [77 °F], 100 kPa). Infobox references

Viriditoxin (VDT) is a secondary metabolite produced by fungi. Viriditoxin is a type of mycotoxin. The biosynthesis of the compound has been investigated.

== Occurrence ==
It is produced by several Aspergillus species including A. aureoluteus, A. brevipes, and A. viridinutans in which it was first identified in 1971. It has been isolated from Paecilomyces variotii, which was obtained from Nomura's jellyfish. It is also produced by Cladosporium cladosporioides.

== Structure ==
Natural viriditoxin exists as a single atropisomer owing to restricted rotation about the C-C bond which joins the two naphthol rings. It has been confirmed by total synthesis to be twisted into the so-called M isomer.

== Biosynthesis ==
Biosynthesis of viriditoxin from polyketide intermediate.

Viriditoxin is a secondary metabolite, a polyketide produced from multiple acetyl-CoA and malonyl-CoA units which are combined by a polyketide synthase (PKS) enzyme complex. A chain of eight acetate units are cyclised to give the three-ring system which forms half of the carbon framework of the final product. After selective methylation of one of the phenol groups and reduction of the pyrone ring, the resulting intermediate (semiviriditoxin) is dimerised by a laccase enzyme, generating specifically the minus M atropisomer.

== Uses ==
In nature, viriditoxin likely is used against microbial competition. On mangroves, P. variotii's production of viriditoxin was linked to antagonism against bacteria.
