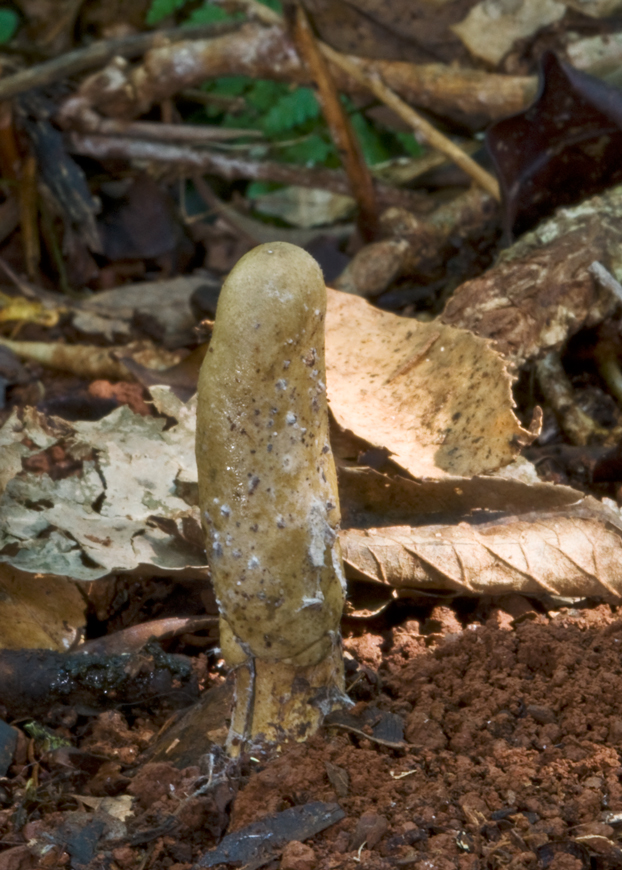

Scientific classification
- Kingdom: Fungi
- Division: Ascomycota
- Class: Sordariomycetes
- Order: Hypocreales
- Family: Cordycipitaceae
- Genus: Cordyceps
- Species: C. gunnii

Binomial name
- Cordyceps gunnii (Berk.) Berk.

Synonyms
- Drechmeria gunnii (Berk.) Spatafora, Kepler & C.A. Quandt; Sphaeria gunnii Berk.; Cordyceps gunnii var. minor Z.Z. Li, C.R. Li, B. Huang, M.Z. Fan & M.W. Lee; Paecilomyces gunnii

= Cordyceps gunnii =

Species of fungus

Cordyceps gunnii is a species of fungus in the family Cordycipitaceae, and is of the genus Cordyceps. It was originally found and recorded by Gunn in Tasmania and named as Sphaeria gunnii, before later research confirmed it belonged to the Cordyceps genus and was renamed Cordyceps gunnii. This fungus and its sisters in the genus Cordyceps are known for growing out of insect bodies. C. gunnii can be found at ground level poking out of caterpillar burrows, attached to a caterpillar's head.

== Morphology ==
=== Macroscopic features ===
This fungus is a perithecial ascomycete. It forms a stroma whose stipe is white-gray colored, between 36.6 and 52.3 mm long and 4.8 to 8.6 mm wide. The ascogenous piece of the stromata is gray colored and 18.5–19.3 mm long and 4 – 9.4 mm wide. C. gunnii can be distinguished from C. sinensis, a very similar species, by having a stouter stroma than C. sinensis’ slender and cylindrical stoma. It is more blandly colored than other representatives in its family who tend to be more brightly colored than C. gunnii.

=== Microscopic features ===
The fungus’ perithecia are embedded into the stroma with papillate openings on surface. Asci are cylindrical with 8 ascospores. The ascospores are filiform, hyaline, multiseptated, breaking into cylindrical and short, 1-celled secondary ascospores.

== Ecology ==
C. gunnii is most commonly found growing out of the heads of moth larvae; specifically, it targets the Hepialidae family, a group known as the ghost moths. One such documented host is the larvae of Phassus excresens. The larva will burrow underground when infected with the fungus, which will grow from the head of the caterpillar up out of the burrow and expose itself to the air where it can release spores.

== Geographical distribution ==
Anhui, Guangdong, Guizhou, Henan, Hunan, Jiangxi, Sichuan and Yunnan provinces of China as well as Australia.

== Uses ==
=== Cultural ===
C. gunnii and other Cordyceps species have been used for a long time as traditional Chinese medicines. As of 2017, the current price of 1 kilogram of this cordyceps is about $2000. Each year roughly ten tons are harvested.

=== Chemicals and secondary metabolites ===
C. gunnii has been shown to have anti-tumor properties and anti-oxidant properties. These make it potentially valuable as an additive into health foods, particularly selenium containing ones, and potentially as a cancer treatment. C. gunnii mycelia has also been found to contain cordycepin, cordycepic acid, polysaccharides and anti-ultraviolet radiation constituents.
