= Patulin =

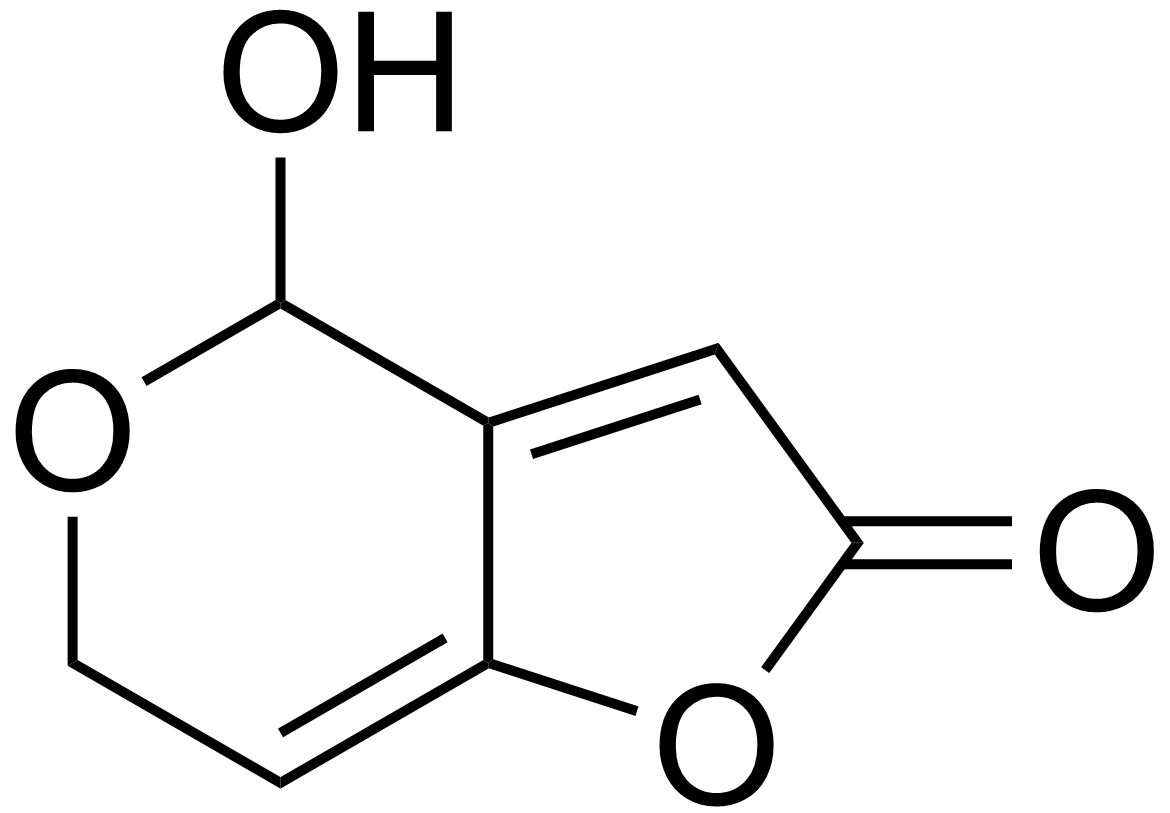

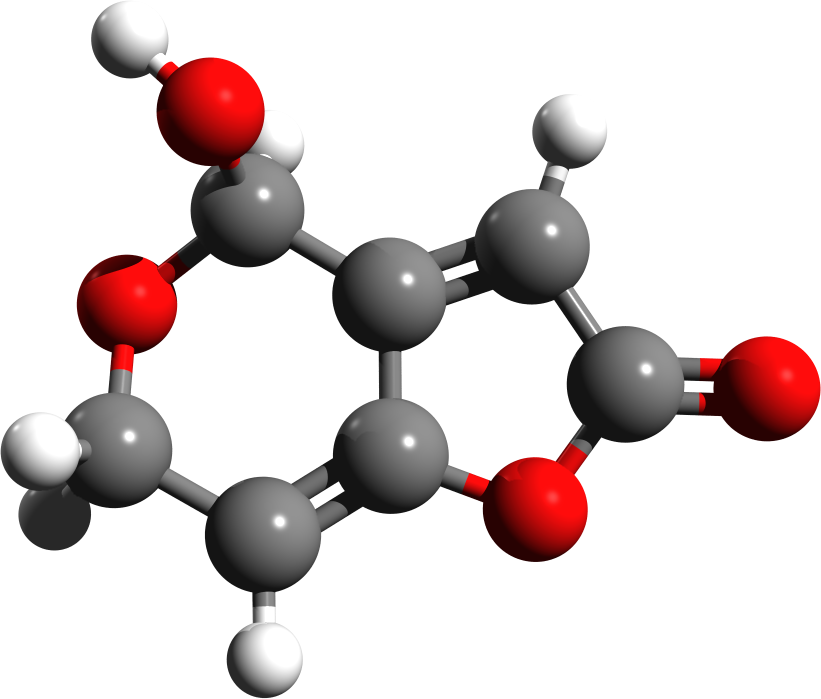

Names
- IUPAC name 4-hydroxy-4H-furo[3,2-c]pyran-2(6H)-one
- Other names 2-Hydroxy-3,7-dioxabicyclo[4.3.0]nona-5,9-dien-8-one; Clairformin; Claviform; Expansine; Clavacin; Clavatin; Expansin; Gigantin; Leucopin; Patuline

Identifiers
CAS Number	149-29-1
3D model (JSmol)	Interactive image
ChEBI	CHEBI:74926
ChEMBL	ChEMBL294018
ChemSpider	4534
ECHA InfoCard	100.005.215
EC Number	205-735-2
KEGG	C16748
PubChem CID	4696
UNII	95X2BV4W8R
CompTox Dashboard (EPA)	DTXSID2021101
- InChI: InChI=1S/C7H6O4/c8-6-3-4-5(11-6)1-2-10-7(4)9/h1,3,7,9H,2H2 Key: ZRWPUFFVAOMMNM-UHFFFAOYSA-N; InChI=1/C7H6O4/c8-6-3-4-5(11-6)1-2-10-7(4)9/h1,3,7,9H,2H2 Key: ZRWPUFFVAOMMNM-UHFFFAOYAU
- SMILES: O=C\1O/C2=C/COC(O)C2=C/1

Properties
Chemical formula	C_{7}H_{6}O_{4}
Molar mass	154.12 g/mol
Appearance	Compact prisms
Density	1.52 g/mL
Melting point	110 °C (230 °F; 383 K)
Solubility in water	Soluble
- Except where otherwise noted, data are given for materials in their standard state (at 25 °C [77 °F], 100 kPa). verify (what is ?) Infobox references

Patulin is an organic compound classified as a polyketide. It is named after the fungus from which it was isolated, Penicillium patulum. It is a white powder soluble in acidic water and in organic solvents. It is a lactone that is heat-stable, so it is not destroyed by pasteurization or thermal denaturation. However, stability following fermentation is lessened. It is a mycotoxin produced by a variety of molds, in particular, Aspergillus and Penicillium and Byssochlamys. Most commonly found in rotting apples, the amount of patulin in apple products is generally viewed as a measure of the quality of the apples used in production. In addition, patulin has been found in other foods such as grains, fruits, and vegetables. Its presence is highly regulated.

== Biosynthesis, synthesis, and reactivity ==
Patulin is biosynthesized from 6-methylsalicylic acid via multiple chemical transformations.

Isoepoxydon dehydrogenase (IDH) is an important enzyme in the multi-step biosynthesis of patulin. Its gene is present in other fungi that may potentially produce the toxin. It is reactive with sulfur dioxide, so antioxidant and antimicrobial agents may be useful to destroy it. Levels of nitrogen, manganese, and pH as well as abundance of necessary enzymes regulate the biosynthetic pathway of patulin.

== Uses ==
Patulin was originally used as an antibiotic against Gram-positive and Gram-negative bacteria, but after several toxicity reports, it is no longer used for that purpose. Isolated by Nancy Atkinson in 1943, it was specifically trialed to be used against the common cold. Patulin is used as a potassium-uptake inhibitor in laboratory applications. Kashif Jilani and co-workers reported that patulin stimulates suicidal erythrocyte death under physiological concentrations.

== Sources of exposure ==
Frequently, patulin is found in apples and apple products such as juices, jams, and ciders. It has also been detected in other fruits including cherries, blueberries, plums, bananas, strawberries, and grapes. Fungal growth leading to patulin production is most common on damaged fruits. Patulin has also been detected in grains like barley, wheat, corn and their processed products as well as in shellfish. Dietary intake of patulin from apple juice has been estimated at between 0.03 and 0.26 μg per kg body weight per day in various age groups and populations. Content of patulin in apple juice is estimated to be less than 10–15 μg/L. A number of studies have looked into comparisons of organic vs conventional harvest of apples and levels of patulin contamination. For example, one study showed 0.9% of children drinking organic apple juice exceeded the tolerable daily intake (TDI) for patulin. A recent article described detection of patulin in marine strains of Penicillium, indicating a potential risk in shellfish consumption.

== Toxicity ==
A subacute rodent NOAEL of 43 μg/kg body weight as well as genotoxicity studies were primarily the cause for setting limits for patulin exposure, although a range of other types of toxicity also exist.

While not a particularly potent toxin, patulin is genotoxic. Some theorize that it may be a carcinogen, although animal studies have remained inconclusive. Patulin has shown antimicrobial properties against some microorganisms. Several countries have instituted patulin restrictions in apple products. The World Health Organization recommends a maximum concentration of 50 μg/L in apple juice. In the European Union, the limit is also set at 50 micrograms per kilogram (μg/kg) in apple juice and cider, at 25 μg/kg in solid apple products, and at 10 μg/kg in products for infants and young children. These limits came into force on 1 November 2003.

=== Acute ===
Patulin is toxic primarily through affinity to sulfhydryl groups (SH), which results in inhibition of enzymes. Oral LD_{50} in rodent models have ranged between 20 and 100 mg/kg. In poultry, the oral LD_{50} range was reported between 50 and 170 mg/kg. Other routes of exposure are more toxic, yet less likely to occur. Major acute toxicity findings include gastrointestinal problems, neurotoxicity (i.e. convulsions), pulmonary congestion, and edema.

=== Subacute ===
Studies in rats showed decreased weight, and gastric, intestinal, and renal function changes, while repetitive doses lead to neurotoxicity. Reproductive toxicity in males was also reported. A NOAEL in rodents was observed at 43 μg/kg body weight.

=== Genotoxicity ===
WHO concluded that patulin is genotoxic based on variable genotoxicity data, however it is considered a group 3 carcinogen by the International Agency for Research on Cancer (IARC) since data was inconclusive.

=== Reproduction studies ===
Patulin decreased sperm count and altered sperm morphology in the rat. Also, it resulted in abortion of F1 litters in rats and mice after i.p. injection. Embryotoxicity and teratogenicity were also reported in chick eggs.

=== Immunotoxicity ===
Patulin was found to be immunotoxic in a number of animal and even human studies. Reduced cytokine secretion, oxidative burst in macrophages, increased splenic T lymphocytes, and increased neutrophil numbers are a few endpoints noticed. However, dietary relevant exposure would not be likely to alter immune response.

=== Human health ===
Although there are only very few reported cases and epidemiological data, the FDA has set an action limit of 50 ppb in cider due to its potential carcinogenicity and other reported adverse effects. In humans, it was tested as an antiviral intranasally for use against the common cold with few significant adverse effects, yet also had negligible or no beneficial effect.

== Risk management and regulations ==
Patulin exposure can be successfully managed by following good agricultural practices such as removing mold, washing, and not using rotten or damaged apples for baking, canning, or juice production.

US

The provisional tolerable daily intake (PTDI) for patulin was set at 0.43 μg/kg body weight by the FDA based on a NOAEL of 0.3 mg/kg body weight per week. Monte Carlo analysis was done on apple juice to compare exposure and the PTDI. Without controls or an action limit, the 90th percentile of consumers would not be above the PTDI. However, the concentration in children 1–2 years old would be three times as high as the PDTI, hence an action limit of 50 μg/kg.

WHO

The World Health Organization recommends a maximum concentration of 50 μg/L in apple juice.

EU

The European Union (EU) has set a maximum limit of 50 μg/kg on fruit juices and drinks, while solid apple products have a limit of 25 μg/kg. For certain foods intended for infants, an even lower limit of 10 μg/kg is observed.

To test for patulin contamination, a variety of methods and sample preparation methods have been employed, including thin layer chromatography (TLC), gas chromatography (GC), high-performance liquid chromatography (HPLC), and capillary electrophoresis.
