= Thermoascaceae =

Scientific classification
- Domain: Eukaryota
- Kingdom: Fungi
- Division: Ascomycota
- Class: Eurotiomycetes
- Order: Eurotiales
- Family: Thermoascaceae; Apinis (1967)

Species
- Paecilomyces; Polypaecilum; Thermoascus

Family of fungi

Thermoascaceae is a family of molds in the order of Eurotiales.
