= Penicillium crystallinum =

Scientific classification
- Domain: Eukaryota
- Kingdom: Fungi
- Division: Ascomycota
- Class: Eurotiomycetes
- Order: Eurotiales
- Family: Aspergillaceae
- Genus: Penicillium
- Species: P. crystallinum

Binomial name
- Penicillium crystallinum Samson, Houbraken, Visagie & Frisvad 2014

Synonyms
- Aspergillus crystallinus

Species of fungus

Penicillium crystallinum is a species of the genus of Penicillium.

== See also ==
- List of Penicillium species
