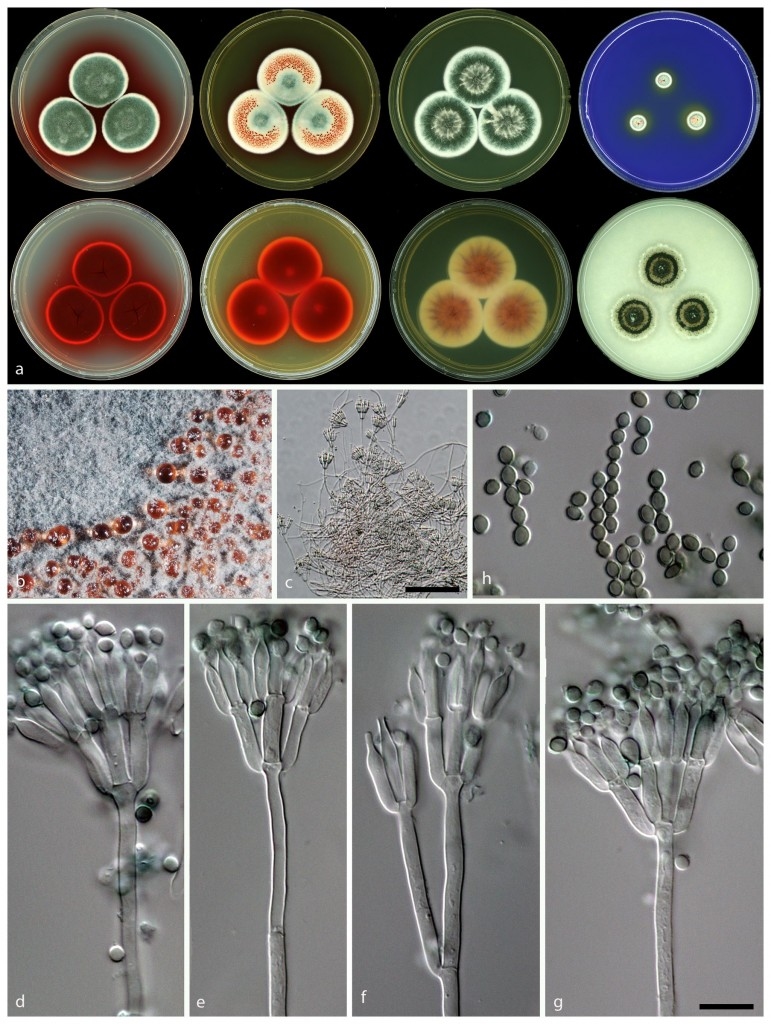
- Talaromyces atroroseus

Scientific classification
- Kingdom: Fungi
- Division: Ascomycota
- Class: Eurotiomycetes
- Order: Eurotiales
- Family: Trichocomaceae
- Genus: Talaromyces; C.R.Benj. (1955)

Type species
- Talaromyces vermiculatus (P.A.Dang.) C.R.Benj. (1955)

Synonyms
- Erythrogymnotheca Yaguchi & Udagawa (1994); Paratalaromyces Matsush. (2003); Sagenoma Stolk & G.F.Orr (1974)

= Talaromyces =

Genus of fungi

Talaromyces is a genus of fungi in the family Trichocomaceae. Described in 1955 by American mycologist Chester Ray Benjamin, species in the genus form soft, cottony fruit bodies (ascocarps) with cell walls made of tightly interwoven hyphae. The fruit bodies are often yellowish or are surrounded by yellowish granules. A 2008 estimate placed 42 species in the genus, but several new species have since been described.

This genus contains the teleomorph of Penicillium.

== Species ==
- T. albobiverticillius
- T. amestolkiae
- T. apiculatus
- T. assiutensis
- T. atroroseus
- T. aurantiacus
- T. austrocalifornicus
- T. bacillisporus
- T. barcinensis
- T. boninensis
- T. brunneus
- T. calidicanius
- T. cecidicola
- T. coalescens
- T. convolutus
- T. dendriticus
- T. derxii
- T. duclauxii
- T. echinosporus
- T. emodensis
- T. erythromellis
- T. euchlorocarpius
- T. flavus
- T. funiculosus
- T. galapagensis
- T. hachijoensis
- T. helicus
- T. indigoticus
- T. intermedius
- T. islandicus
- T. lagunensis
- T. leycettanus
- T. loliensis
- T. luteus
- T. macrosporus
- T. malagensis
- T. marneffei
- T. mimosinus
- T. minioluteus
- T. muroii
- T. palmae
- T. panamensis
- T. paucisporus
- T. phialosporus
- T. piceus
- T. pinophilus
- T. pittii
- T. primulinus
- T. proteolyticus
- T. pseudostromaticus
- T. purpureus
- T. purpurogenus
- T. rademirici
- T. radicus
- T. ramulosus
- T. retardatus
- T. rotundus
- T. ruber
- T. rubicundus
- T. rugulosus
- T. ryukyuensis
- T. sabulosus
- T. siamensis
- T. stipitatus
- T. stollii
- T. subinflatus
- T. sublevisporus
- T. tardifaciens
- T. thermocitrinus
- T. trachyspermus
- T. ucrainicus
- T. udagawae
- T. unicus
- T. variabilis
- T. varians
- T. vermiculatus = T. flavus
- T. verruculosus
- T. viridis
- T. viridulus
- T. wortmannii
