= Emericella =

Scientific classification
- Kingdom: Fungi
- Division: Ascomycota
- Class: Eurotiomycetes
- Order: Eurotiales
- Family: Trichocomaceae
- Genus: Emericella; Berk. 1857

Former genus of fungi

Emericella is a former genus of fungi.

The genus name of Emericella is in honour of Emeric Streatfield Berkeley (1834 - 1898), a British Lieutenant/Major General who served in India. He was also a botanist.

Species described in Emericella were identified as teleomorphs of the Nidulantes subgenus in Aspergillus and were eventually merged following the establishment of the "one fungus : one name" rule in 2011. It was considered to continue usage of the Emericella genus name by breaking up the genus Aspergillus along delineations of subgenera. As of 2020, former teleomorphic genera of Aspergillus are now understood as morphotypes describing the morphology of teleomorphs. Emericella is now "emericella-type".

The chemical compound stromemycin has been found in marine Emericella. In terms of composition, stromemycin is a C-glycoside and a depside. In terms of mechanism of action it is a matrix metalloproteinase inhibitor.

== Species ==
Emericella acristata
Emericella appendiculata
Emericella astellata
Emericella bicolor
Emericella cleistominuta
Emericella corrugata
Emericella dentata
Emericella desertorum
Emericella discophora
Emericella echinulata
Emericella falconensis
Emericella filifera
Emericella foeniculicola
Emericella foveolata
Emericella indica
Emericella miyajii
Emericella montenegroi
Emericella navahoensis
Emericella olivicola
Emericella omanensis
Emericella pluriseminata
Emericella purpurea
Emericella qinqixianii
Emericella similis
Emericella spectabilis
Emericella stella-maris
Emericella striata
Emericella sublata
Emericella undulata
Emericella venezuelensis
Emericella violacea
