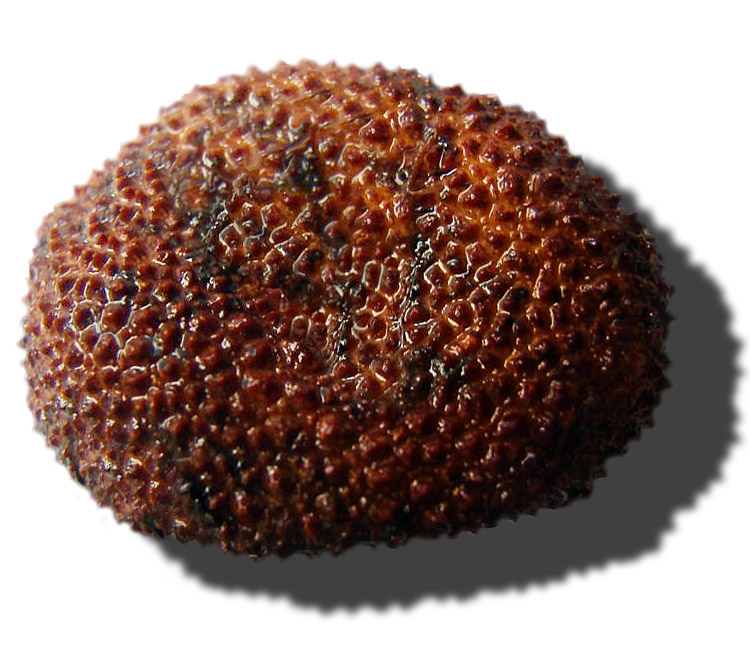

Scientific classification
- Kingdom: Fungi
- Division: Ascomycota
- Class: Eurotiomycetes
- Order: Eurotiales
- Family: Elaphomycetaceae
- Genus: Elaphomyces
- Species: E. granulatus

Binomial name
- Elaphomyces granulatus Fr.

Synonyms
- List: ? scaber Willd.; Ceraunium granulatum (Fr.) Wallr.; Ceraunium scabrum (Willd.) Wallr.; Elaphomyces asperulus var. hassiacus (R.Hesse) Fontana; Elaphomyces cervinus (L.) J.Schröt.; Elaphomyces cervinus (L.) Schltdl.; Elaphomyces cervinus var. hassiacus (R.Hesse) E.Fisch.; Elaphomyces cervinus var. scaber (Willd.) Schltdl.; Elaphomyces granulatus f. pallidosporus De Vito, Faust.García, A.Paz & Lavoise; Elaphomyces granulatus var. scaber (Willd.) Rabenh.; Elaphomyces hassiacus R.Hesse; Elaphomyces plicatus R.Hesse, 1891; Elaphomyces vulgaris var. columellifer Corda; Elaphomyces vulgaris var. granulatus (Fr.) Corda; Hypogaeum cervinum (L.) Pers.; Lycoperdastrum cervinum (L.) Kuntze; Lycoperdon cervinum L.; Lycoperdon scabrum Willd.; Phymatium fulvum Chevall., 1826; Scleroderma aurantium var. cervinum (L.) Rea; Scleroderma cervinum (L.) Pers.; Scleroderma cervinum subsp. cervinum; Scleroderma cervinum var. granulatum Alb. & Schwein.; Scleroderma cervinum var. scabrum Pers.; Scleroderma vulgare subsp. cervinum (L.) W.G.Sm., 1908; Scleroderma vulgare var. cervinum (L.) W.G.Sm.; Sphaeria cervina (L.) F.H.Wigg.; Tuber cervinum (L.) Nees

= Elaphomyces granulatus =

Species of fungus

Elaphomyces granulatus is a truffle-like, hypogeous fungus of the Elaphomyces genus. It is widespread, occurring in North America, Europe, northern Asia, and Chile.

== Description ==
The fruiting body grows beneath the ground and is approximately round-ish or kidney-shaped.The peridium is an ochre color and is covered with small, pointy bumps; the inside is white. Its spores are spiny or warty, and difficult to distinguish from the spores of related fungi such as E. asperulus.

== Uses ==
In traditional medicine in Mexico, it is used as a galactagogue and to reduce bleeding. It also has ritual uses connected to the ingestion of Psilocybe mushrooms and Tolypocladium ophioglossoides, in which E. granulatus is called "el gran mundo" (the great world), Psilocybe spp. is called "mujercita" (little woman), and T. ophioglosoides is called "hombrecito" (little man).

In English medicine, it was used prior to the 19th century as a galactagogue and a medication against stroke. In folk medicine it was also used as an aphrodisiac.
