= Emericella filifera =

Scientific classification
- Kingdom: Fungi
- Division: Ascomycota
- Class: Eurotiomycetes
- Order: Eurotiales
- Family: Trichocomaceae
- Genus: Emericella
- Species: E. filifera

Binomial name
- Emericella filifera Zalar, Frisvad, Gunde-Cimerman, Varga & Samson, 2008

Species of fungus

Emericella filifera is a fungus. Its ascospores form long appendages that emerge radially from narrow stellate crests. It was isolated from raisins in Argentina.

== See also ==
- Emericella discophora
- Emericella olivicola
- Emericella stella-maris
