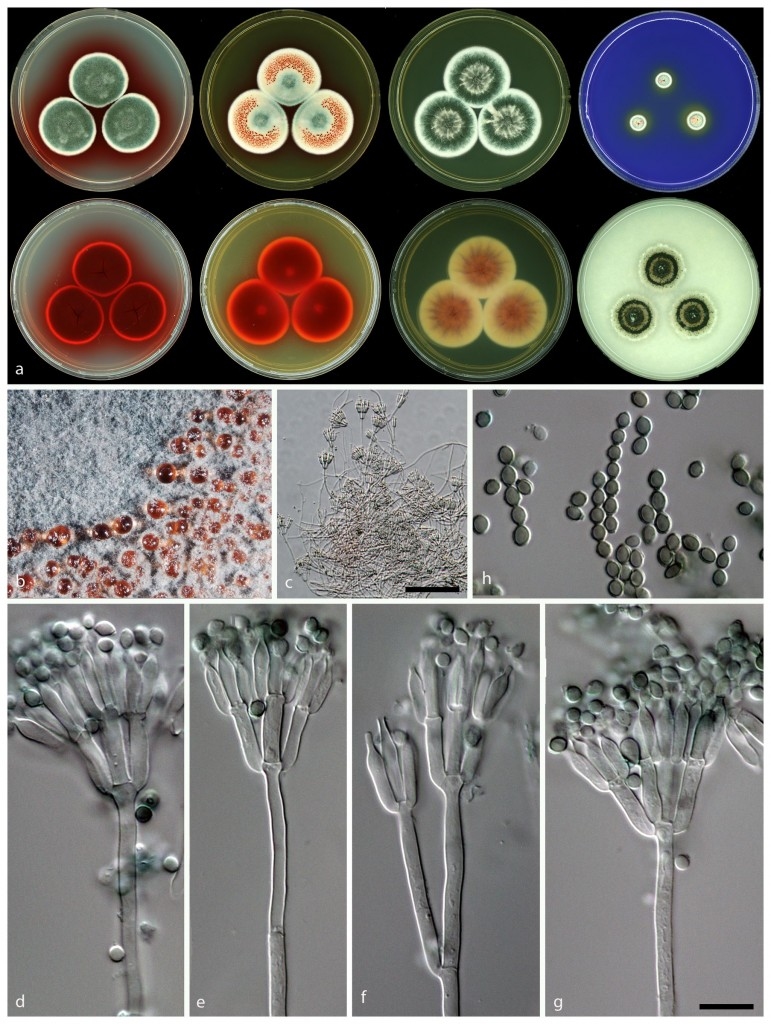
- Talaromyces atroroseus

Scientific classification
- Kingdom: Fungi
- Division: Ascomycota
- Class: Eurotiomycetes
- Order: Eurotiales
- Family: Trichocomaceae
- Genus: Talaromyces
- Species: T. atroroseus

Binomial name
- Talaromyces atroroseus Yilmaz, Frisvad, Houbraken & Samson (2013)

= Talaromyces atroroseus =

Species of fungus

Talaromyces atroroseus is a species of fungus described as new to science in 2013. Found in soil and fruit, it was first identified from house dust collected in South Africa. The fungus produces a stable red pigment with no known toxins that, it is speculated, could be used in manufacturing, especially mass-produced foods.
