= Aspergillus transmontanensis =

Scientific classification
- Kingdom: Fungi
- Division: Ascomycota
- Class: Eurotiomycetes
- Order: Eurotiales
- Family: Aspergillaceae
- Genus: Aspergillus
- Species: A. transmontanensis

Binomial name
- Aspergillus transmontanensis P. Rodrigues, S.W. Peterson, N. Lima & Venâncio

Species of fungus

Aspergillus transmontanensis is a species of fungus in the family Trichocomaceae first isolated from almonds and maize in Portugal. It is from the genus Aspergillus and the Flavi section. It has been reported to produce aflatoxin B and aflatoxin G.

== Growth and morphology ==
A. transmontanensis has been cultivated on both Czapek yeast extract agar (CYA) plates and Malt Extract Agar Oxoid® (MEAOX) plates. The growth morphology of the colonies can be seen in the pictures below.

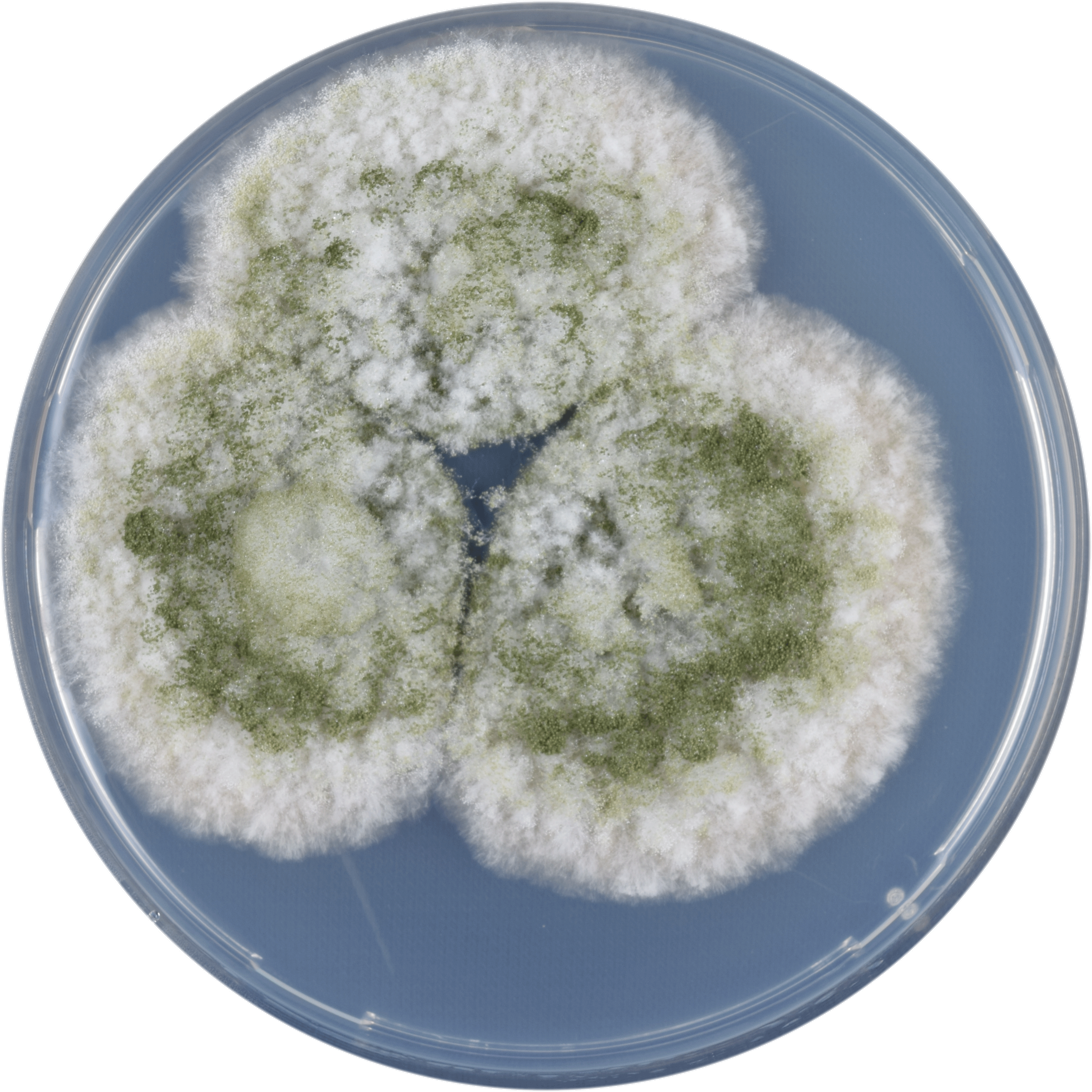
Aspergillus transmontanensis growing on CYA plate

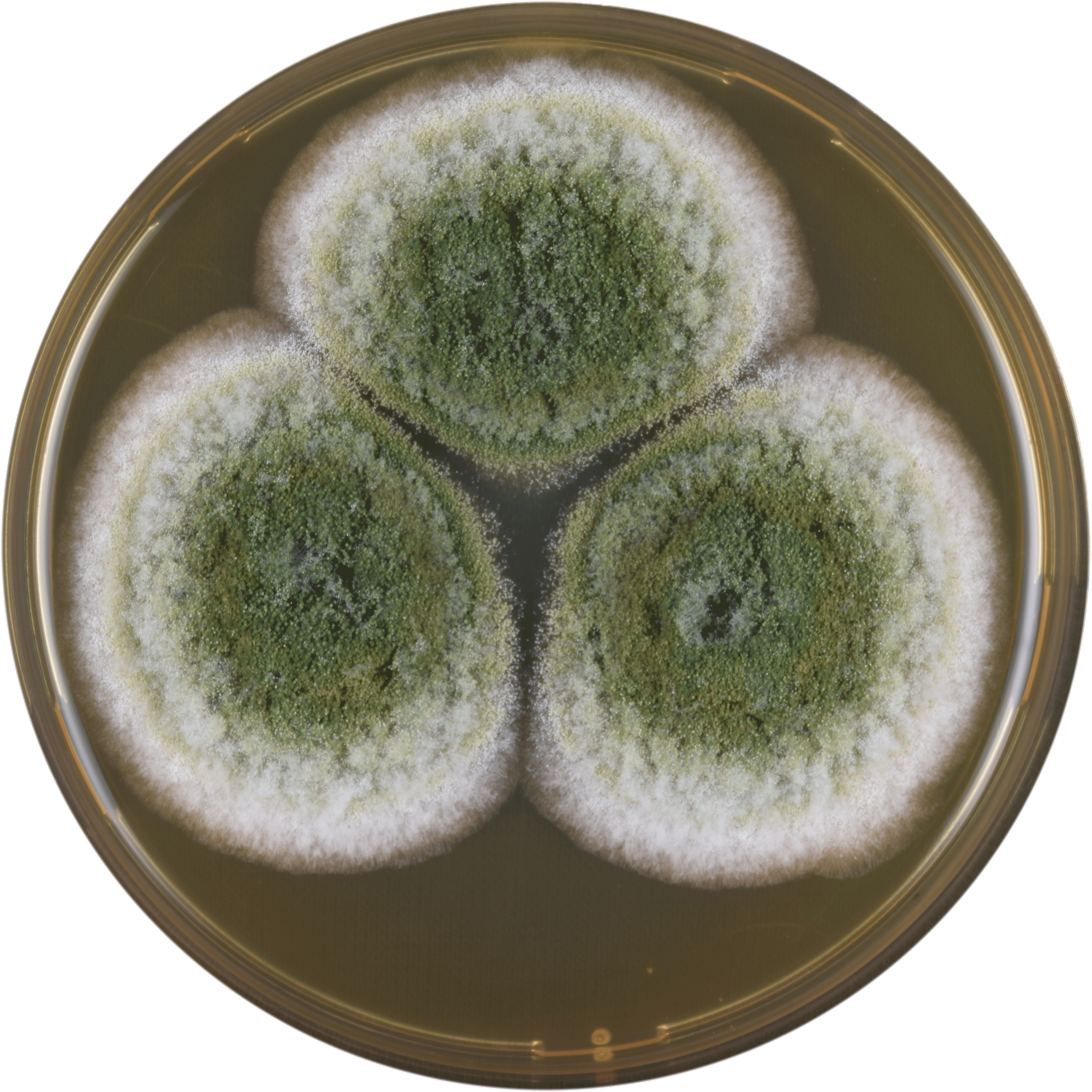
Aspergillus transmontanensis growing on MEAOX plate
