= Emericella stella-maris =

Scientific classification
- Kingdom: Fungi
- Division: Ascomycota
- Class: Eurotiomycetes
- Order: Eurotiales
- Family: Trichocomaceae
- Genus: Emericella
- Species: E. stella-maris

Binomial name
- Emericella stella-maris Zalar, Frisvad, Gunde-Cimerman, Varga & Samson, 2008

Species of fungus

Emericella stella-maris is a fungus. Its ascospores have star-shaped equatorial crests. It was isolated from leaf litter in Tunisia.

== See also ==
- Emericella discophora
- Emericella filifera
- Emericella olivicola
