= Emericella discophora =

Scientific classification
- Kingdom: Fungi
- Division: Ascomycota
- Class: Eurotiomycetes
- Order: Eurotiales
- Family: Trichocomaceae
- Genus: Emericella
- Species: E. discophora

Binomial name
- Emericella discophora Zalar, Frisvad, Gunde-Cimerman, Varga & Samson, 2008

Species of fungus

Emericella discophora is a fungus. Its ascospores produce wide and entire, nonstellate equatorial crests. It was isolated from soil in Spain.

== See also ==
- Emericella filifera
- Emericella olivicola
- Emericella stella-maris
