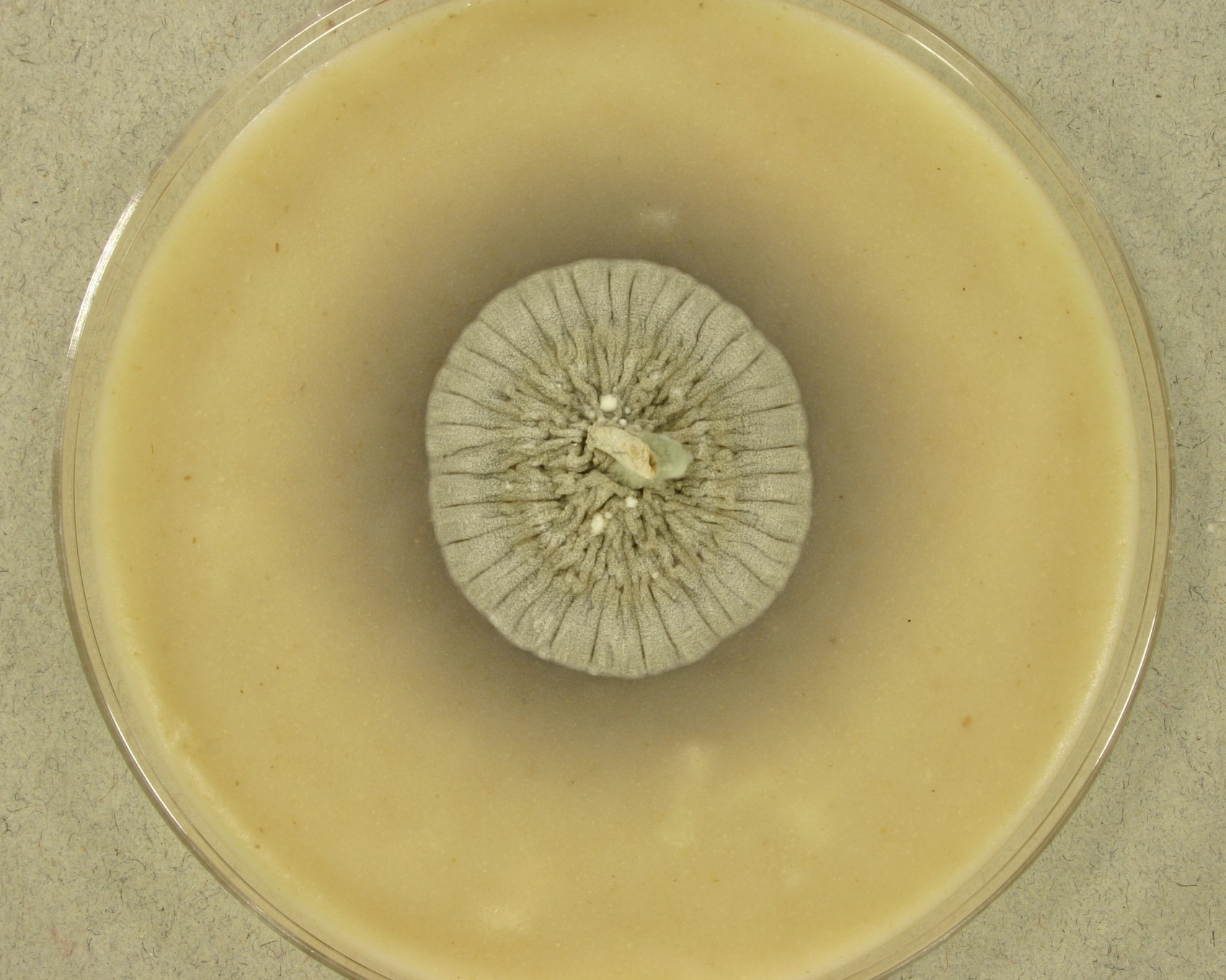

Scientific classification
- Kingdom: Fungi
- Division: Ascomycota
- Class: Eurotiomycetes
- Order: Eurotiales
- Family: Trichocomaceae
- Genus: Sagenomella
- Species: S. keratitidis

Binomial name
- Sagenomella keratitidis Sung-Yaon Hsieh et al. (2009)

= Sagenomella keratitidis =

Species of fungus

Sagenomella keratitidis is a hyphomycete discovered as its own species in 2008 by Sung-Yaon Hsieh et al. at the Institute of Plant and Microbial Biology and the National Taiwan University Hospital.

== History and taxonomy ==
Studies prior to 2009 showed evidence of fungal keratitis development with the use of contact lenses, but very little evidence of the development of keratitis associated with contact lens wear. Fungal keratitis associated with contact lens wear is quite rare when compared to microbial keratitis. Fungal keratitis accounts for only 5% of keratitides. The majority of Sagenomella species are soil-associated. S. keratitidis is the first species that is associated with the human eye. It was discovered in 2010 that Sagenomella can be grouped into three distinct categories, and these groups are not all descended from a common ancestor. DNA sequence analysis studies showed that S. keratitidis is most closely related to Sagenomella sclerotialis with two species showing 99% DNA homology. The researchers in Taiwan proposed the genus Sagenomella based on growth pattern and morphology.

== Growth and morphology ==
S. keratitidis has very slow growth on a range of cultures, making experiments involving isolation and purification very difficult. It has translucent, linked ameroconidia and very small conidiophores— its unusually small, few conidiophores are the reason why the colonies are white rather than gray. S. keratitidis species have spherical, phialidic conidia. Sagenomella species are closely related to Acremonium, but distinguished by their linked conidia. Sagenomella species are also distinguished from Acremonium species by their sharp-tipped, abruptly-ending conidia. S. keratitidis lacks chlamydospores. S. keratitidis may superficially resemble another member of its genus,S.humicola, under a microscope, but can be distinguished from S.humicola because of its extremely slow growth and lack of chlamydospores.

== Physiology ==
The species of genus Sagenomella generally grow between the temperatures of 20-23 °C on malt extract agar, and are known for their slow growth. Little is known so far about the physiology of S. keratitidis but its close relative, S.chlamydospora, grows best between a temperature of 37 °C and 40 °C, above which it does not survive. Ideal growth for Sagenomella species is at 27 °C.S. keratitidis was found to grow better on media that had been modified with yeast.

== Pathogenicity ==
Sagenomella species normally cause unspecific symptoms and infections of Sagenomella are difficult to diagnose because this is an uncommon genus of fungus.S. keratitidis was found to cause inflammation of the cornea, or keratitis, in an individual who wore contact lenses. So far, this has been the only case of keratitis found to be caused by S. keratitidis.S. keratitidis is not as pathogenic as other members of the same genus, such as S.chlamydospora, which can cause serious mycosis in canines. Canine S.chlamydospora infections can cause the animal to limp, experience pain in its spine, and feel a general lack of energy. If left untreated, these infections can spread to humans.

== Habitat and ecology ==
S. keratitidis is a human eye pathogen, unlike its other genus counterparts, whose habitat is either soil, manure, or fodder. Although rare, it may occur due to poor sanitation in individuals who wear contact lenses.
