= Neosartorya pseudofischeri =

Scientific classification
- Kingdom: Fungi
- Division: Ascomycota
- Class: Eurotiomycetes
- Order: Eurotiales
- Family: Trichocomaceae
- Genus: Neosartorya
- Species: N. pseudofischeri

Binomial name
- Neosartorya pseudofischeri Peterson

Species of fungus

Neosartorya pseudofischeri is a fungus first isolated at an autopsy from a fungal lesion occurring in human neck vertebrae. Its ascospore morphology was identical to that of Aspergillus thermomutatus.

Neosartorya species are the sexual states (teleomorph) of Aspergillus species, notably the Aspergillus fumigatus group among others.
