= Alsophila lunulata =

Alsophila lunulata refers to one of two species of tree ferns:

- Alsophila lunulata (G.Forst.) R.Br., synonym of Sphaeropteris lunulata (G.Forst.) R.M.Tryon
- Alsophila lunulata Blume, synonym of Alsophila junghuhniana Kunze
