= Rasamsonia =

Scientific classification
- Kingdom: Fungi
- Division: Ascomycota
- Class: Eurotiomycetes
- Order: Eurotiales
- Family: Trichocomaceae
- Genus: Rasamsonia; Houbraken & Frisvad (2011)

Type species
- Rasamsonia emersonii (Stolk) Houbraken & Frisvad (2011)

Genus of fungi

Rasamsonia is a genus of fungi in the family Trichocomaceae, circumscribed in 2011 by mycologists Jos Houbraken and Jens Frisvad. It is characterized from other genera of the Trichocomaceae by the following combination of features: species are thermotolerant or thermophilic; their conidiophores have distinctly rough-walled stipes; conidia are olive brown; and ascomata, if present, have minimal covering. Rasamsonia phenotypically resembles Paecilomyces, in that both have thermotolerant species, produce olive-brown conidia, and form ascomata with no or scarce ascomatal covering; Rasamsonia, however, differs from Paecilomyces in having more regularly branched conidiophores with distinct rough-walled structures. The type species is Rasamsonia emersonii, a fungus formerly classified in the genus Talaromyces.

== Clinical relevance ==
Due to an increase in reports of human and animal mycosis by Rasamsonia argillacea (formerly Geosmithia argillacea), it has been considered an emerging pathogen. In 2013, molecular analysis was used to identify four species in the R. argillacea species complex, including R. eburnea, and the newly described R. piperina and R. aegroticola. These fungi, which can be identified with internal transcribed spacer sequences, have similar antifungal susceptibility profiles.

== Species ==
- Rasamsonia aegroticola Houbraken, S.Giraud & Samson (2012)
- Rasamsonia argillacea (Stolk, H.C.Evans & T. Nilsson) Houbraken & Frisvad (2011)
- Rasamsonia brevistipitata Houbraken & Frisvad (2011)
- Rasamsonia byssochlamydoides (Stolk & Samson) Houbraken & Frisvad (2011)
- Rasamsonia columbiensis Jurjević, Hubka & S.W.Peterson (2016)
- Rasamsonia composticola Y.Y.Su & L.Cai (2012)
- Rasamsonia cylindrospora (G.Sm.) Houbraken & Frisvad (2011)
- Rasamsonia eburnea (Yaguchi, Someya & Udagawa) Houbraken & Frisvad (2011)
- Rasamsonia emersonii (Stolk) Houbraken & Frisvad (2011)
- Rasamsonia piperina Houbraken, S.Giraud & Samson (2012)
- Rasamsonia pulvericola J.B.Tanney & K.A.Seifert (2013)
