= Truffle (disambiguation) =

The truffle is the edible body of fungi in the genus Tuber.

Truffle or Truffles may also refer to:

- Chocolate truffle, a chocolate confection
- Magic truffle, the mycelium of magic mushrooms
- Truffles (character), a character on Chowder
- Truffles, a Happy Tree Friends character
- "Savoy Truffle", a song by The Beatles
- In programming language implementation, the Truffle interpreter implementation framework, used with GraalVM
- Truffle, the Rhinarium of a canine.

== See also ==
- False truffle, various kinds of hypogeous fungi other than Tuber
  - Desert truffle or Terfezia
  - Elaphomyces granulatus or hart's truffles, a species of fungus in Elaphomyces
