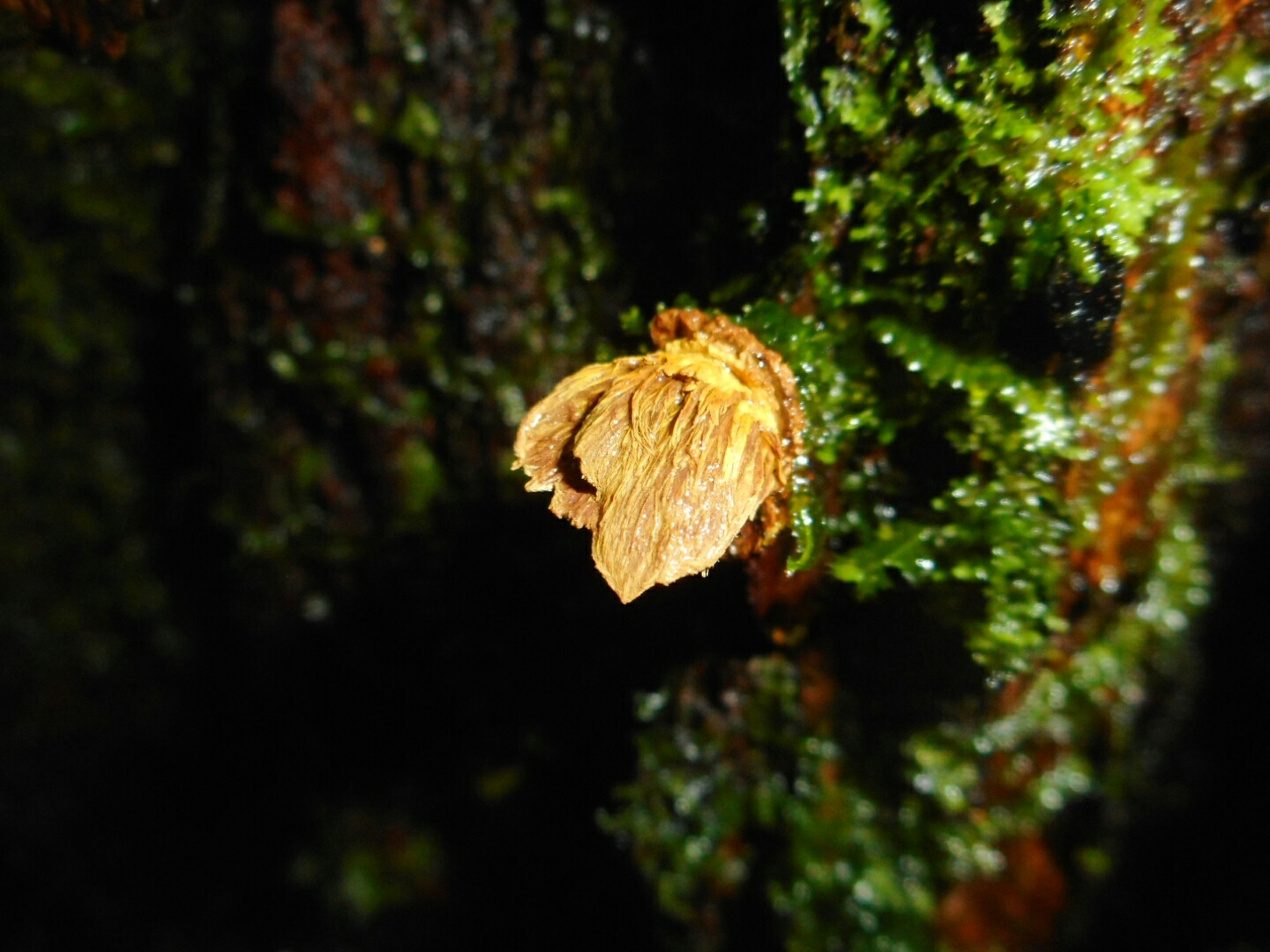
- Trichocoma paradoxa

Scientific classification
- Domain: Eukaryota
- Kingdom: Fungi
- Division: Ascomycota
- Class: Eurotiomycetes
- Order: Eurotiales
- Family: Trichocomaceae
- Genus: Trichocoma; Jungh. (1838)

Type species
- Trichocoma paradoxa Jungh. (1838)

Species
- T. levispora T. paradoxa

Synonyms
- Trichoskytale Corda (1842)

= Trichocoma =

Genus of fungi

Trichocoma is a genus of fungi in the family Trichocomaceae. The type species, Trichocoma paradoxa, is widespread in tropical regions. Commonly known as the "shaving brush fungus", it is about 2 cm tall, 0.5 cm wide, and not edible. Mostly found during the winter season, it is spore bearing.
