= Penicillium pseudostromaticum =

Scientific classification
- Kingdom: Fungi
- Division: Ascomycota
- Class: Eurotiomycetes
- Order: Eurotiales
- Family: Aspergillaceae
- Genus: Penicillium
- Species: P. pseudostromaticum

Binomial name
- Penicillium pseudostromaticum Hodges, C.S. Jr; Warner, G.M.; Rogerson, C.T. 1970

Type strain
- ATCC 18919, BCRC 31669, CBS 470.70, CCRC 31669, FRR 2039

Synonyms
- Talaromyces pseudostromaticus

Species of fungus

Penicillium pseudostromaticum is an anamorph species of fungus in the genus Penicillium which was isolated from the mushroom Piptoporus betulinus which grew on the tree Betula populifolia.
