= Penicillium siamense =

Scientific classification
- Kingdom: Fungi
- Division: Ascomycota
- Class: Eurotiomycetes
- Order: Eurotiales
- Family: Aspergillaceae
- Genus: Penicillium
- Species: P. siamense

Binomial name
- Penicillium siamense Manoch, L.; Ramírez, C. 1988

Type strain
- ATCC 64685, CBS 475.88, FRR 3620, IMI 323204, KCTC 16060, KCTC 6392, KUM 717, TISTR 3355

Synonyms
- Talaromyces siamensis

Species of fungus

Penicillium siamense is an anamorph species of fungus in the genus Penicillium which was isolated from forest soil in Thailand.
