= Penicillium minioluteum =

Scientific classification
- Kingdom: Fungi
- Division: Ascomycota
- Class: Eurotiomycetes
- Order: Eurotiales
- Family: Aspergillaceae
- Genus: Penicillium
- Species: P. minioluteum

Binomial name
- Penicillium minioluteum Dierckx, R.P. 1901

Type strain
- CBS 642.68, IMI 089377, MUCL 28666

Synonyms
- Talaromyces minioluteus, Penicillium gaditanum, Penicillium samsonii Penicillium miniolutum

Species of fungus

Penicillium minioluteum is an anamorph species of the genus Penicillium which produces dextranase, miniolin A, miniolin B and miniolin C.
