= Penicillium rademirici =

Scientific classification
- Kingdom: Fungi
- Division: Ascomycota
- Class: Eurotiomycetes
- Order: Eurotiales
- Family: Aspergillaceae
- Genus: Penicillium
- Species: P. rademirici

Binomial name
- Penicillium rademirici Quintanilla, J.A. 1985

Type strain
- CBS 140.84, CECT 2771, IMI 282406, IMI 327870, Quintanilla 1248

Synonyms
- Talaromyces rademirici

Species of fungus

Penicillium rademirici is a species of fungus in the genus Penicillium.
