= Justus Carl Hasskarl =

German explorer and botanist

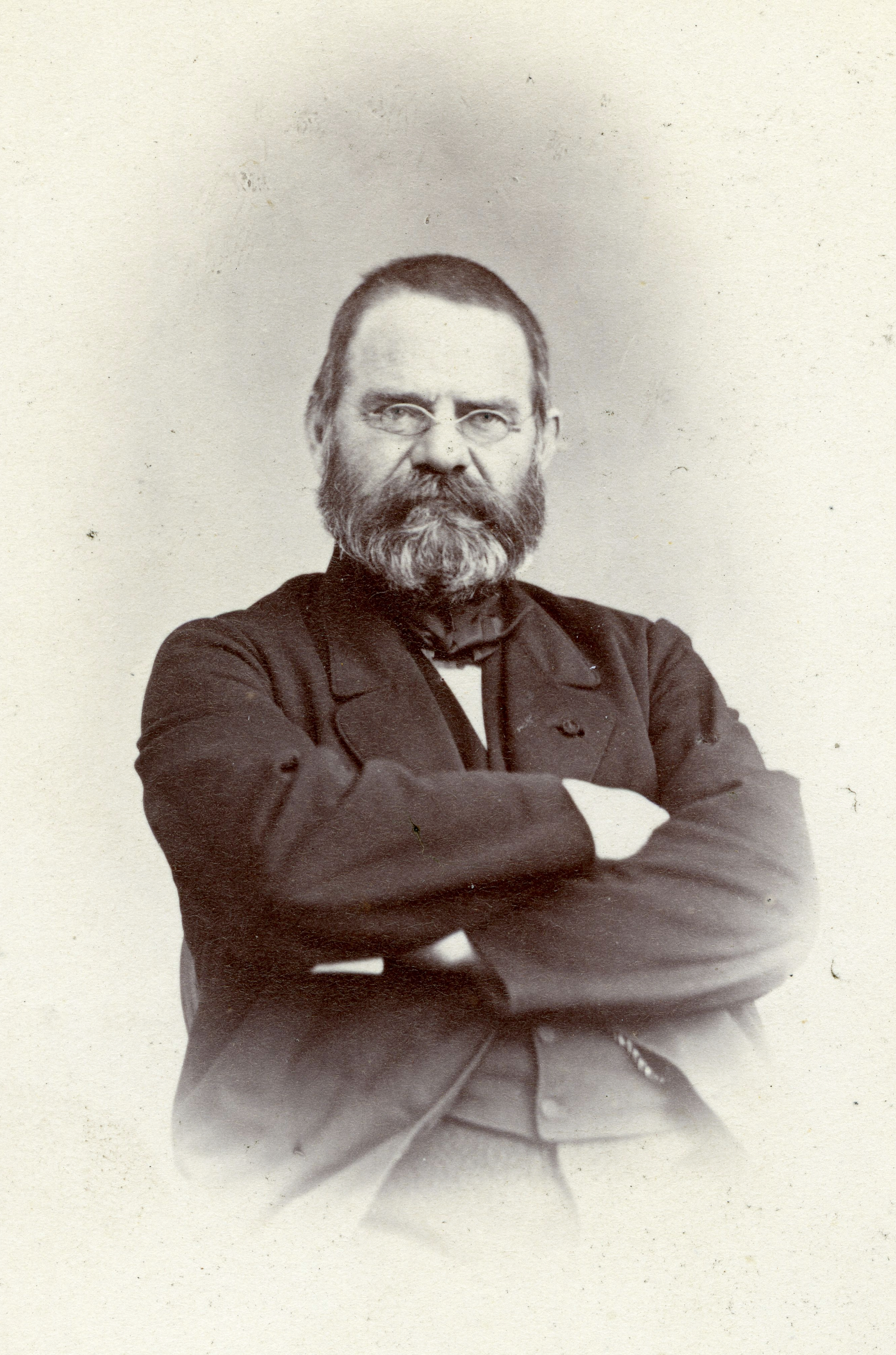
- Born: 6 December 1811; Kassel, Kingdom of Westphalia
- Died: 5 January 1894 (aged 82); Kleve, Kingdom of Prussia
- Occupation(s): Botanist, explorer
- Scientific career
- Author abbrev. (botany): Hassk.

Justus Carl Hasskarl (6 December 1811 – 5 January 1894) was a German explorer and botanist specializing in pteridophytes, bryophytes and spermatophytes.

== Biography ==
Justus Carl Hasskarl was born in Kassel in the Kingdom of Westphalia. In his earlier life he studied at a plant nursery in Poppelsdorf in 1827. In 1834 he studied natural history while at the same time preparing himself for an expedition to the tropics.

In 1836, he traveled to Java and tried to make a living through his knowledge in physics and medicine, with little success. Subsequently, he sent a request to the governor general to work in the National Botanical Garden and a year later he was appointed assistant curator. With director Johannes Elias Teijsmann, they rearranged their crops to taxonomic families, which would result in the displacement of many specimens in the botanical garden. Together they organized expeditions to various parts of modern Indonesia and expand the number of plants collection in the Botanic Garden. Hasskarl also proposed starting a library (Bibliotheca Bogoriensis) which was opened in 1842 and Herbarium Bogoriense in 1844.

In 1852, the Netherlands government sent him to Lima and in early 1853, Justus made an expedition to the interior of Peru and even reaching the eastern border of Lake Titicaca, where he gathered Cinchona trees for Malaria treatment. In 1854 he sent his collections of seeds and specimens back to the Netherlands and introduced Cinchona trees to Java, the extract of the tree would later be used to make quinine. However, due to his worsening health he had to return to Netherlands in 1856.

Later he participated in examining and describe the Commelinaceae of Georg August Schweinfurth's Abyssinian plant collections and also worked on several plant families, such as Cyathea junghuhniana in Leiden. In 1855 he became a member of the Royal Netherlands Academy of Arts and Sciences. He resigned in 1859.

The genus Hasskarlia Baill. in the family Euphorbiaceae is named in his honor.

== See also ==
- List of botanists by author abbreviation
