= Aspergillus thermomutatus =

Scientific classification
- Kingdom: Fungi
- Division: Ascomycota
- Class: Eurotiomycetes
- Order: Eurotiales
- Family: Aspergillaceae
- Genus: Aspergillus
- Species: A. thermomutatus

Binomial name
- Aspergillus thermomutatus (Paden) S.W. Peterson (1992)

Synonyms
- Neosartorya pseudofischeri

Species of fungus

Aspergillus thermomutatus (also called Neosartorya pseudofischeri) is a species of fungus in the genus Aspergillus. It is from the Fumigati section. The species was first described in 1992. It has been reported to produce asperfuran, cytochalasin-like compounds, fiscalin-like compounds, pyripyropens, and gliotoxin.

== Growth and morphology ==
A. thermomutatus has been cultivated on both Czapek yeast extract agar (CYA) plates and Malt Extract Agar Oxoid® (MEAOX) plates. The growth morphology of the colonies can be seen in the pictures below.

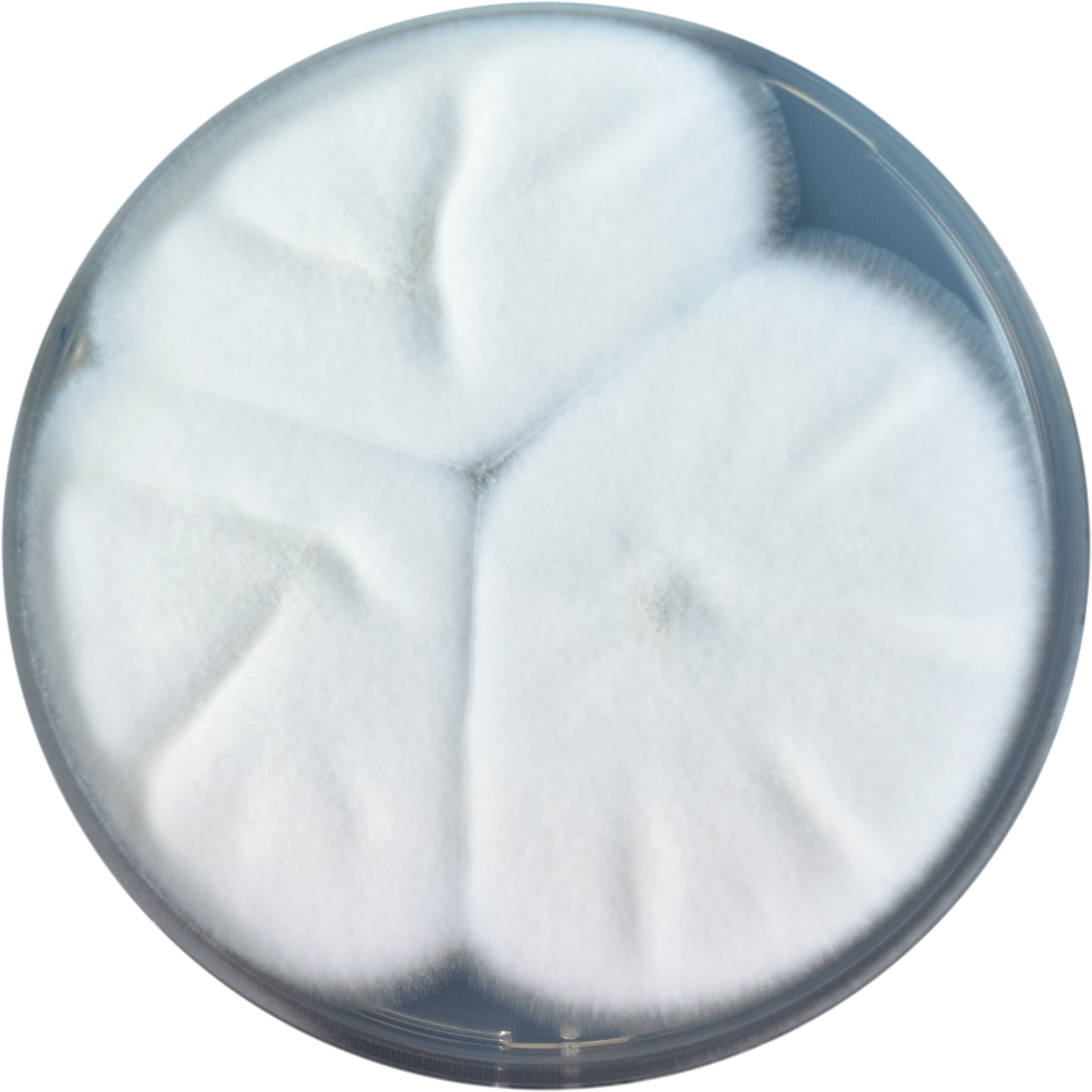
Aspergillus thermomutatus growing on CYA plate

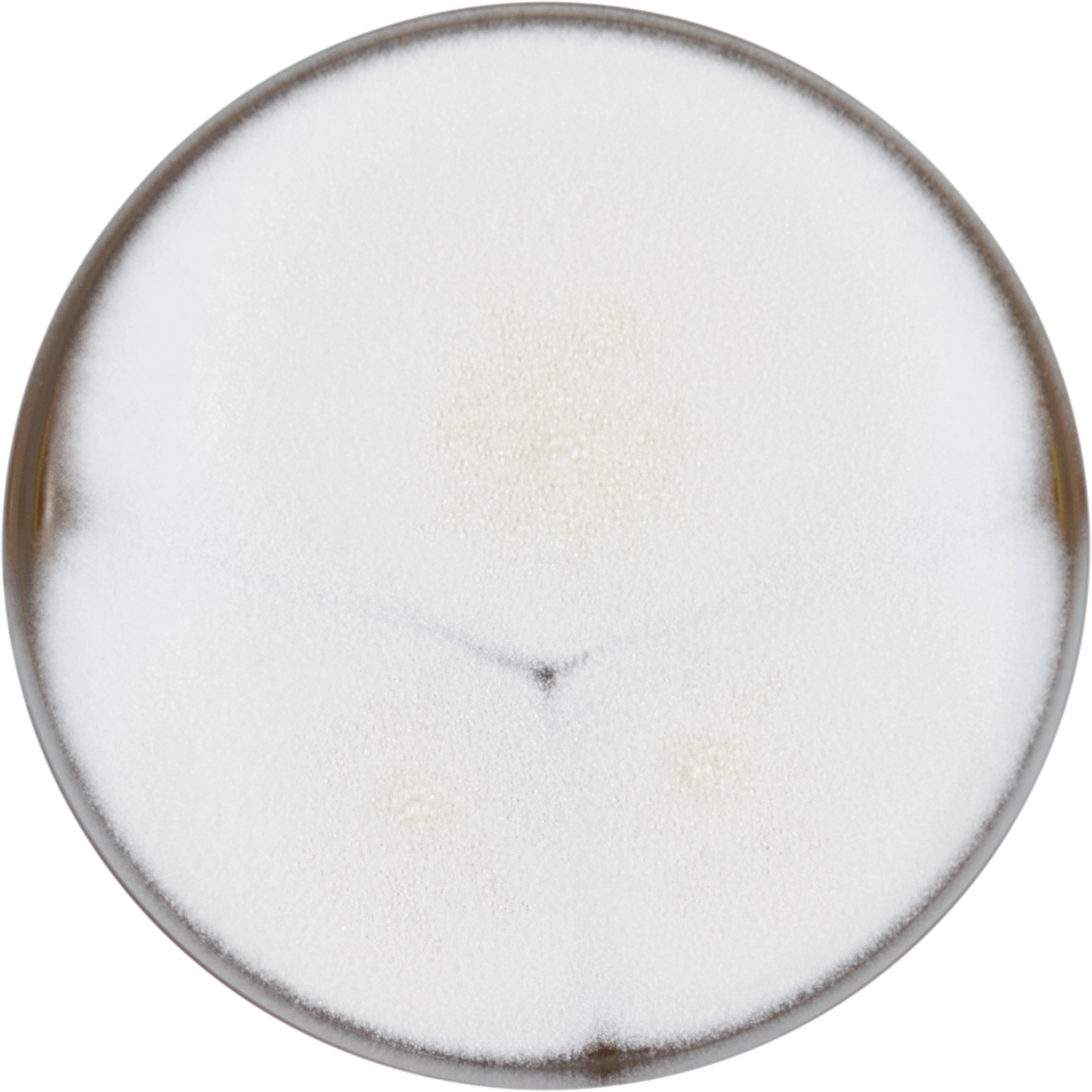
Aspergillus thermomutatus growing on MEAOX plate
