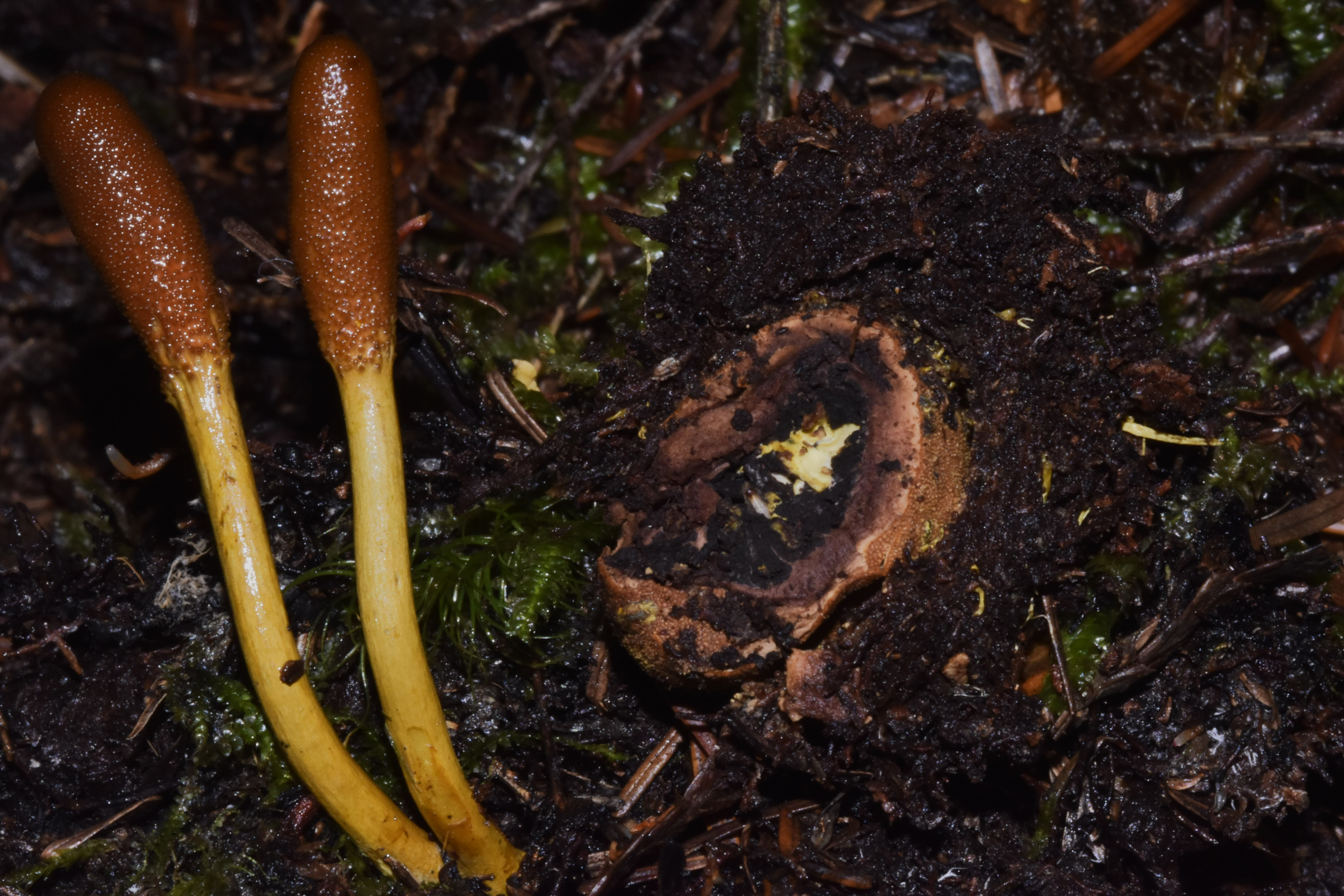

Conservation status
- Vulnerable (NatureServe)

Scientific classification
- Kingdom: Fungi
- Division: Ascomycota
- Class: Sordariomycetes
- Order: Hypocreales
- Family: Ophiocordycipitaceae
- Genus: Tolypocladium
- Species: T. ophioglossoides

Binomial name
- Tolypocladium ophioglossoides (Ehrh.) Quandt, Kepler & Spatafora (2014)

Synonyms
- Clavaria parasitica Willd. (1787); Sphaeria ophioglossoides J.F.Gmel. (1792); Cordylia ophioglossoides J.F.Gmel. (1818); Cordyceps ophioglossoides (Ehrh.) Link (1833); Xylaria ophioglossoides Grognot (1863); Torrubia ophioglossoides (Ehrh.) Tul. & C.Tul. (1865); Cordyceps parasitica (Willd.) Henn. (1904); Cordyceps ophioglossoides f. cuboides Kobayasi (1960); Cordyceps ophioglossoides f. alba Kobayasi & Shimizu ex Y.J.Yao (1995); Elaphocordyceps ophioglossoides (Ehrh.) G.H.Sung, J.M.Sung & Spatafora (2007); Elaphocordyceps ophioglossoides f. cuboides (Kobayasi) G.H. Sung, J.M.Sung & Spatafora (2007)

= Tolypocladium ophioglossoides =

Species of fungus

Tolypocladium ophioglossoides, also known by two of its better known synonyms Elaphocordyceps ophioglossoides and Cordyceps ophioglossoides and commonly known as the goldenthread cordyceps, is a species of fungus in the family Ophiocordycipitaceae. It is parasitic on fruit bodies of the truffle-like Elaphomyces. The species is considered inedible, but is valued in traditional Chinese medicine.

== Taxonomy ==
This species was first described in 1785 as Sphaeria ophioglossoides by German naturalist Jakob Friedrich Ehrhart.

The specific epithet ophioglossoides, derived from Ancient Greek, means "like a snake's tongue".

== Description ==
T. ophioglossoides falls under the morphological category of earth tongue fungi. Its sporocarps are 2–8 centimetres (3/4–3 1/4 in) long, clavate and simple or rarely branched. Rhizomorphs attach the fruiting body to its host.

=== Similar species ===
It is similar to species within the genus including T. capitatum. Other earth tongues typically lack distinctive bumps.

== Distribution and habitat ==
Its geographical distribution is throughout the Northern Hemisphere. It fruits in late summer and fall, often under oak or pine trees because Elaphomyces, its host, prefers those tree species.

== Uses ==
The species is considered inedible.

=== Medicinal ===
In traditional Chinese medicine, T. ophioglossoides is used as an herbal remedy of hot temperature (sharing phylogenetic branch, genetic material and habitat with other species of that classification) for relieving postmenopausal syndrome in women.

The mycelium of T. ophioglossoides may protect humans from Alzheimer's disease. Production of intracellular polysaccharides in T. ophioglossoides may explain its medicinal antioxidant properties, used to fight menopause symptoms and neurodegenerative disease.

=== Model organism ===
T. ophioglossoides has also been used as a model organism to understand genetic mechanisms that drive transitions from parasitism on insects to truffles. In the lab, secondary metabolite core genes are upregulated when T. ophioglossoides is grown on insect cuticles, but downregulated when grown on species of the genus Elaphomyces.

=== Bioactive compounds ===
Because of its beneficial medicinal properties, scientists have begun to conduct research on the genes of T. ophioglossoides to understand secondary metabolite synthesis. T. ophioglossoides produces most notably peptaibiotics and balanol.

T. ophioglossoides produces peptaibiotics via nonribosomal peptide synthetases. Peptaibiotics have antibiotic and antifungal properties.

Balanol is a protein kinase inhibitor which inhibits cancer cells from growing in humans and affects other human disease states, including central nervous system diseases, cardiovascular diseases, diabetes, asthma and HIV. T. ophioglossoides has been cultured with genetic modification to produce balanol at higher concentrations.

A novel nontoxic form of arsenic called Arsenocholine-O-sulfate has been found within the body of T. ophioglossoides in significant amounts. The functionality of Arsenocholine-O-Sulfate in T. ophioglossoides is unknown. It is unclear whether T. ophioglossoides takes up Arsenocholine-O-Sulfate as a byproduct of uptaking choline-O-sulfate, a compound used as for sulfate storage and as an osmolyte, whether it takes up AC-O-Sulfate for a biological function, or whether it synthesizes Arsenocholine-O-Sulfate internally.
