= Pseudotulostoma =

Scientific classification
- Kingdom: Fungi
- Division: Ascomycota
- Class: Eurotiomycetes
- Order: Eurotiales
- Family: Elaphomycetaceae
- Genus: Pseudotulostoma; O.K.Mill. & T.W.Henkel (2001)

Type species
- Pseudotulostoma volvata O.K.Mill. & T.W.Henkel (2001)

Species
- See text

Genus of fungi

Pseudotulostoma is a genus of fungi in the family Elaphomycetaceae. The genus contains two species; one found in Guyana and one in Japan.

== Species ==
The genus consists of the following species:

- Pseudotulostoma japonicum – Japan
- Pseudotulostoma volvata – Guyana, ectomycorrhizal with Dicymbe corymbosa

== See also ==
- Tulostoma
