= Penicillium radicum =

Scientific classification
- Kingdom: Fungi
- Division: Ascomycota
- Class: Eurotiomycetes
- Order: Eurotiales
- Family: Aspergillaceae
- Genus: Penicillium
- Species: P. radicum

Binomial name
- Penicillium radicum Hocking, A.D.; Whitelaw, M.; Harden, T.J. 1998

Type strain
- ATCC 201836, CBS 100489, DAR 72374, FRR 4718

Synonyms
- Talaromyces radicus

Species of fungus

Penicillium radicum is an anamorph species of the genus of Penicillium which was isolated from rhizosphere of Australian wheat. This species has the ability to solubilise inorganic phosphates, this can promote plant growth Penicillium radicum produces rugulosin
