= Penicillium piceum =

Scientific classification
- Domain: Eukaryota
- Kingdom: Fungi
- Division: Ascomycota
- Class: Eurotiomycetes
- Order: Eurotiales
- Family: Aspergillaceae
- Genus: Penicillium
- Species: P. piceum

Binomial name
- Penicillium piceum Raper, K.B.; Fennell, D.I. 1948

Type strain
- ATCC 10519, CBS 361.48, IMI 040038, NRRL 1051

Synonyms
- Talaromyces piceus, Penicillium ilerdanum

Species of fungus

Penicillium piceum is an anamorph species of fungi in the genus Penicillium which can cause in rare cases chronic granulomatous disease. This species has been isolated from human blood cultures and from pig lung tissue. Penicillium piceum produces β-glucosidase
