= Penicillium primulinum =

Scientific classification
- Domain: Eukaryota
- Kingdom: Fungi
- Division: Ascomycota
- Class: Eurotiomycetes
- Order: Eurotiales
- Family: Aspergillaceae
- Genus: Penicillium
- Species: P. primulinum

Binomial name
- Penicillium primulinum Pitt, J.I. 1979

Type strain
- ATCC 10438, B 40031, BCRC 32761, CBS 321.48, CBS 439.88, CCRC 32761, FRR 1074, IFO 9204, IHEM 3905, IMI 040031, Janssen 40031, MUCL 31321, MUCL 31330, MUCL 34594, MUCL 38783, NBRC 9204, NRRL 1074, QM 1922 T, Thom 5421.50X

Synonyms
- Talaromyces primulinus, Penicillium diversum var. aureum

Species of fungus

Penicillium primulinum is an anamorph species of fungus in the genus Penicillium.
