= Aspergillus astellatus =

Scientific classification
- Kingdom: Fungi
- Division: Ascomycota
- Class: Eurotiomycetes
- Order: Eurotiales
- Family: Aspergillaceae
- Genus: Aspergillus
- Species: A. astellatus

Binomial name
- Aspergillus astellatus (Fennell & Raper) Houbraken, Visagie & Samson 2014

Type strain
- CBS 134.55, CBS 261.93, NRRL 2396, WB 2396 = CBS 134.55 = IBT 22589

Synonyms
- Aspergillus variecolor var. astellatus, Aspergillus stellatus var. astellatus, Emericella astellata

Species of fungus

Aspergillus astellatus is a species of the genus of Aspergillus. It is from the Nidulantes section. Aspergillus astellatus produces Aflatoxin B1, Aflatoxin B2 and sterigmatocystin.

== Growth and morphology ==
A. astellatus has been cultivated on both Czapek yeast extract agar (CYA) plates and Malt Extract Agar Oxoid (MEAOX) plates. The growth morphology of the colonies can be seen in the pictures below.

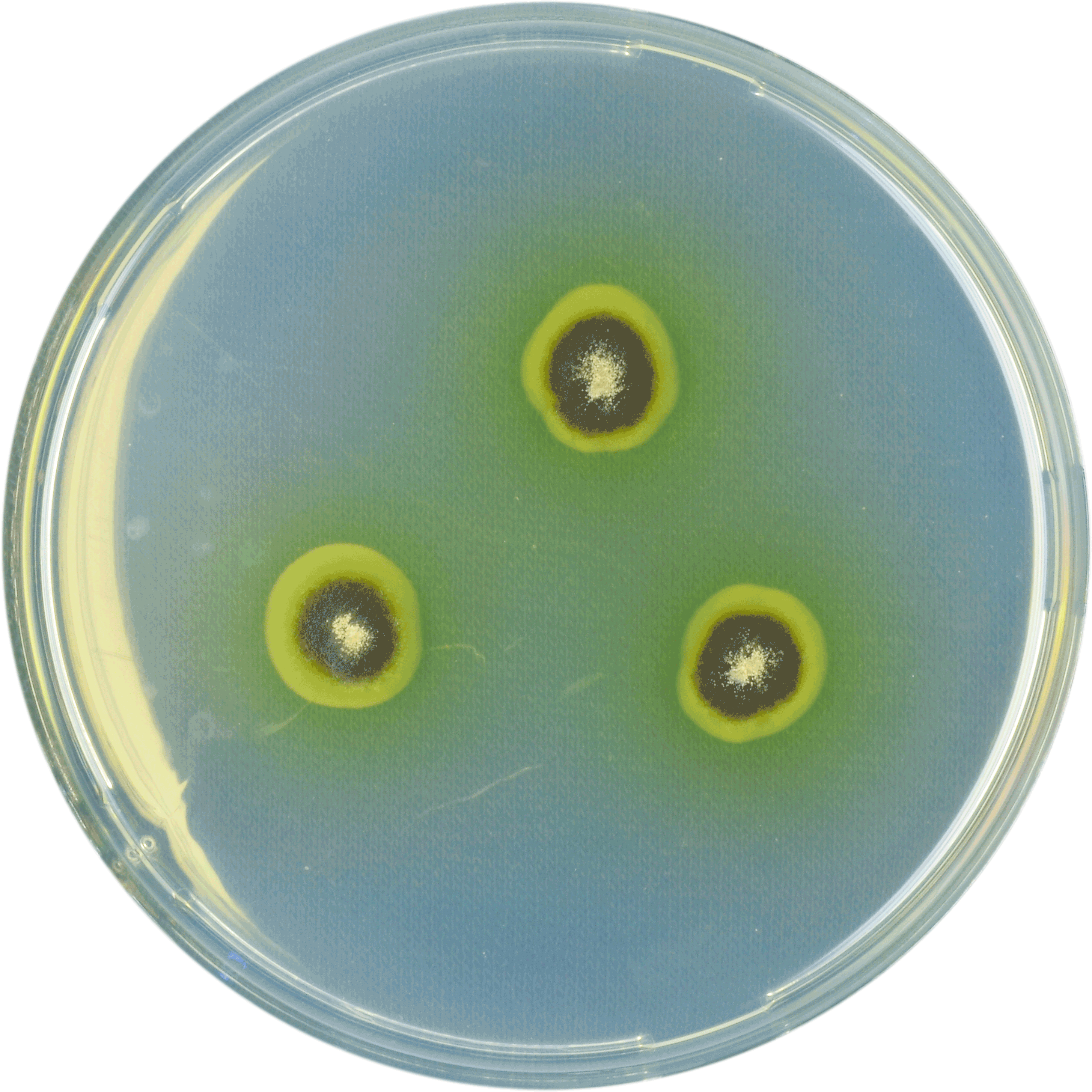
Aspergillus astellatus growing on CYA plate

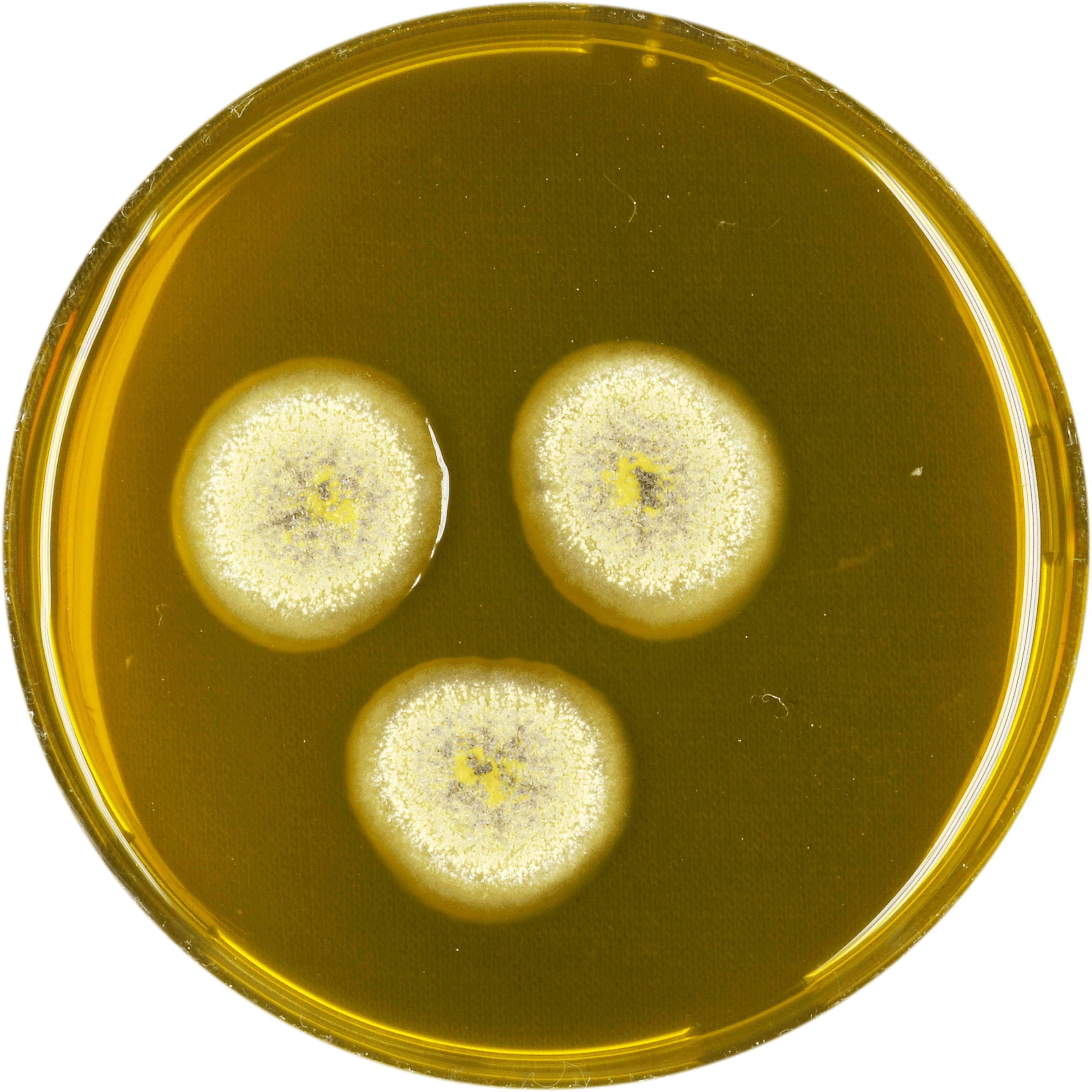
Aspergillus astellatus growing on MEAOX plate
