= Penicillium dendriticum =

Scientific classification
- Kingdom: Fungi
- Division: Ascomycota
- Class: Eurotiomycetes
- Order: Eurotiales
- Family: Aspergillaceae
- Genus: Penicillium
- Species: P. dendriticum

Binomial name
- Penicillium dendriticum Pitt 1980

Type strain
- ATCC 48972, CBS 660.80, FRR 1885, IFO 30686, IMI 216897, KCTC 6417, MUCL 38973, NBRC 30686, OL 80

Synonyms
- Talaromyces dendriticus

Species of fungus

Penicillium dendriticum is an anamorph species of the genus of Penicillium which produces Secalonic acid D and Secalonic acid F.

== See also ==
- List of Penicillium species
