= Chester Ray Benjamin =

American mycologist

- Born: January 23, 1923; Ohio
- Died: April 20, 2002 (aged 79); Silver Spring, Maryland
- Education: University of Iowa
- Known for: Taxonomy of the Eurotiales and Mucorales
- Scientific career
- Fields: Mycology
- Doctoral advisor: George Willard Martin
- Author abbrev. (botany): C.R.Benj.

Chester Ray Benjamin (January 23, 1923 – April 20, 2002) was an American mycologist. His research was focused on the taxonomy of fungal molds belonging to the orders Eurotiales and Mucorales. Born and raised in Ohio, Benjamin received his undergraduate education from Mount Union College in Alliance after serving in the Navy for four years during World War II. Benjamin earned his Doctoral degree (dissertation title: "Ascocarps of Aspergillus and Penicillium") in 1955 from the University of Iowa under the tutelage of George Willard Martin.

In 1960 Benjamin started an 11-year position as principal mycologist in the Crops Protection Research Branch of the Agricultural Research Service in Beltsville. In 1967, Benjamin was the president of the Mycological Society of America. From 1971 until his retirement, he held various positions in the Agriculture Department. Benjamin died of a heart attack at his home in Silver Spring, Maryland at the age of 79. The genus Benjaminia was named in his honor.

== See also ==
- List of mycologists
