= Aspergillus desertorum =

Scientific classification
- Kingdom: Fungi
- Division: Ascomycota
- Class: Eurotiomycetes
- Order: Eurotiales
- Family: Aspergillaceae
- Genus: Aspergillus
- Species: A. desertorum

Binomial name
- Aspergillus desertorum (Samson & Mouchacca) Samson, Visagie & Houbraken (1974) Samson, Visagie & Houbraken (2014)

Type strain
- CBS 653.73, IFO 30840, IMI 343076, NBRC 30840, NRRL 5921

Synonyms
- Emericella desertorum

Species of fungus

Aspergillus desertorum is a species of fungus in the genus Aspergillus which has been isolated from desert soil. It is from the Nidulantes section. Aspergillus desertorum produces desertorin A, desertorin B, desertorin C, paxiline and emindol DA.

In 2016, the genome of A. desertorum was sequenced as a part of the Aspergillus whole-genome sequencing project - a project dedicated to performing whole-genome sequencing of all members of the genus Aspergillus. The genome assembly size was 29.04 Mbp.

== Growth and morphology ==
A. desertorum has been cultivated on both Czapek yeast extract agar (CYA) plates and Malt Extract Agar Oxoid® (MEAOX) plates. The growth morphology of the colonies can be seen in the pictures below.

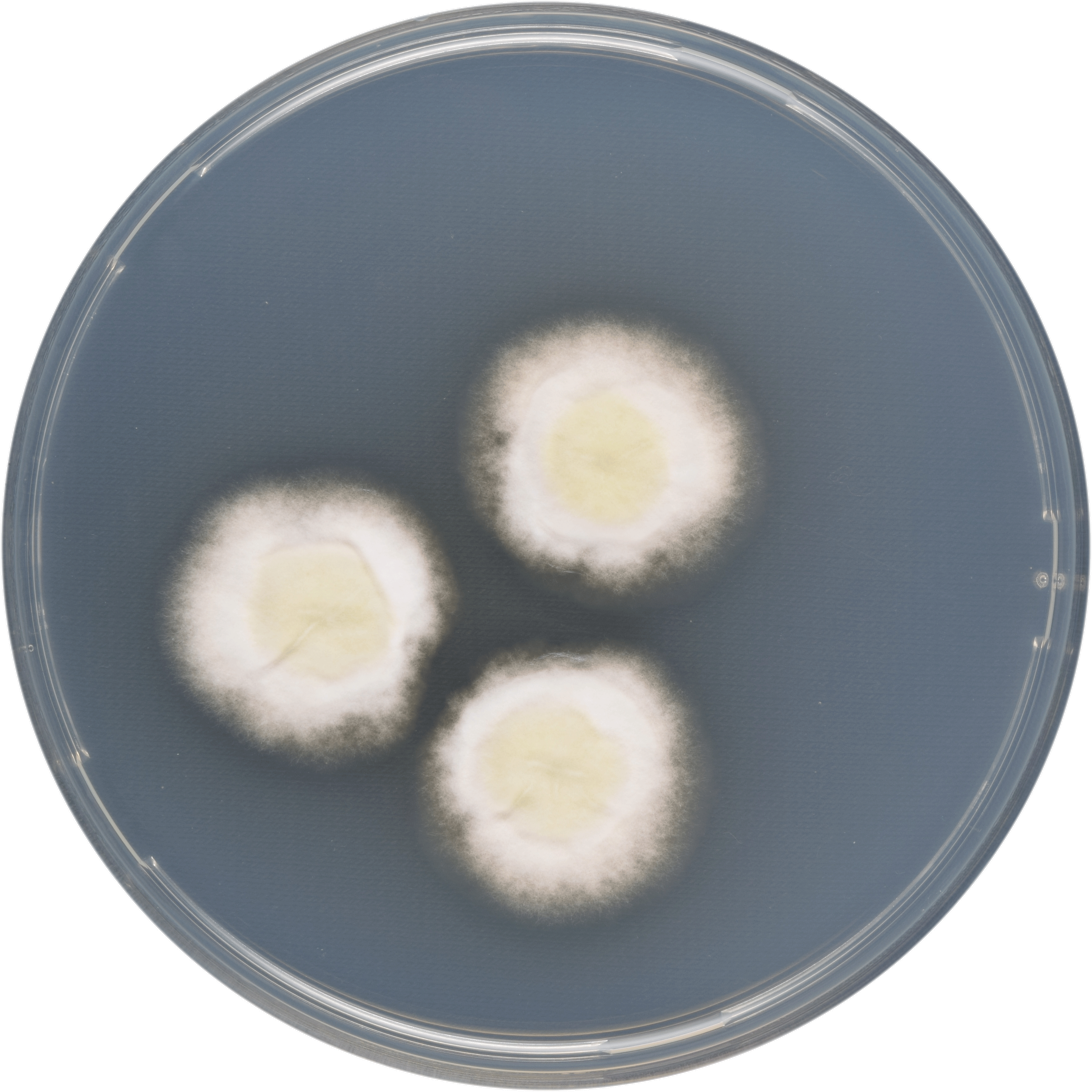
Aspergillus desertorum growing on CYA plate

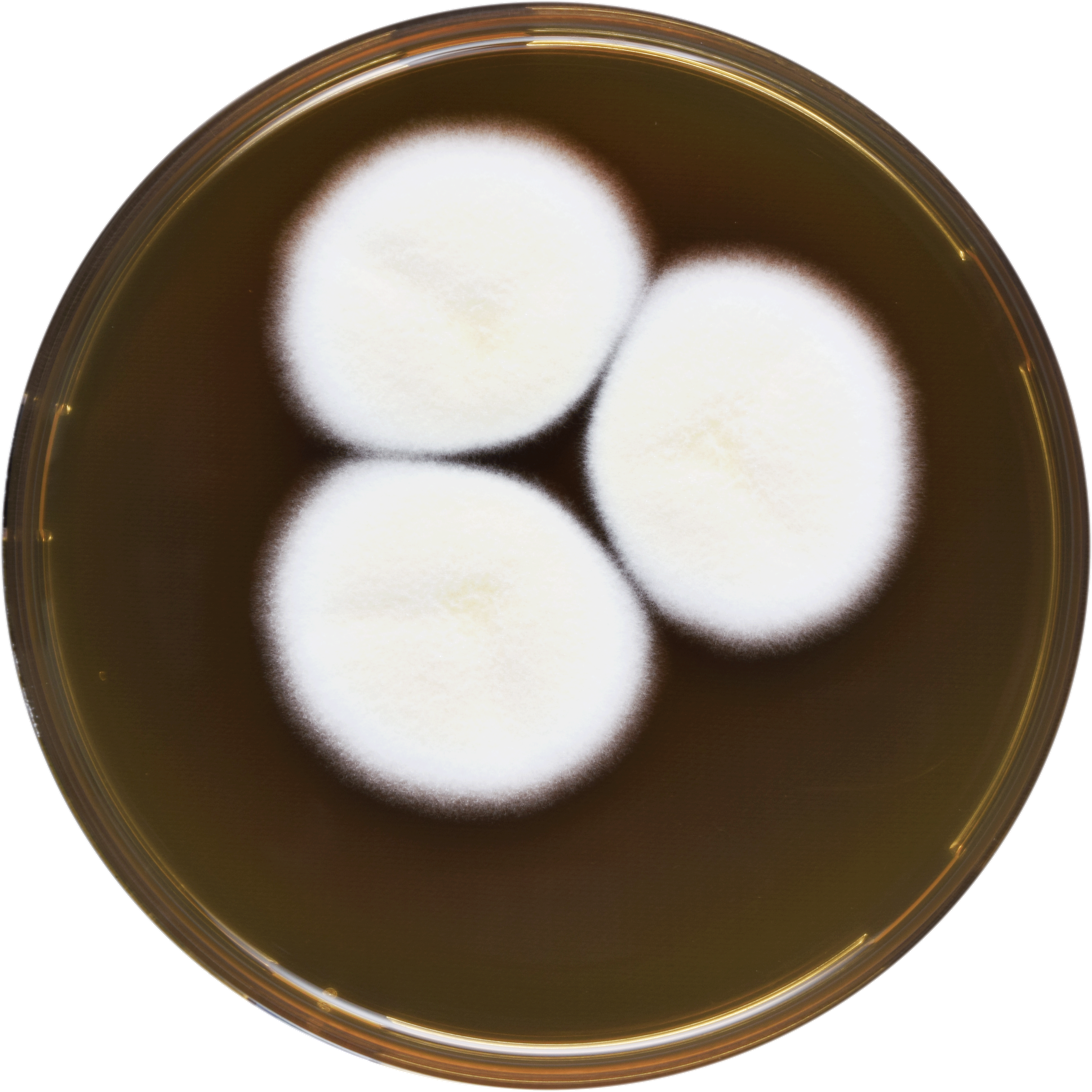
Aspergillus desertorum growing on MEAOX plate
