= Penicillium sabulosum =

Scientific classification
- Kingdom: Fungi
- Division: Ascomycota
- Class: Eurotiomycetes
- Order: Eurotiales
- Family: Aspergillaceae
- Genus: Penicillium
- Species: P. sabulosum

Binomial name
- Penicillium sabulosum Pitt, J.I.; Hocking, A.D. 1985

Type strain
- ATCC 56984, ATCC 65984, CBS 261.87, FRR 2743, IFO 33092, IMI 288715, NBRC 33092, UAMH 5304

Synonyms
- Talaromyces sabulosus

Species of fungus

Penicillium sabulosum is an anamorph species of fungus in the genus Penicillium.
