= Sagenomella =

Scientific classification
- Kingdom: Fungi
- Division: Ascomycota
- Class: Eurotiomycetes
- Order: Eurotiales
- Family: Trichocomaceae
- Genus: Sagenomella; W.Gams (1978)

Type species
- Sagenomella diversispora (J.F.H.Beyma) W.Gams (1978)

Genus of fungi

Sagenomella is a genus of filamentous Ascomycota fungus that has reported to cause systemic illness in animals. The genus was circumscribed by Walter Gams in 1978.

Sagenomella chlamydospora has been reported to cause a systemic illness in dogs.

They are normally considered a non-dermatophytic fungi. Both skeletal and visceral phaeohyphomycosis due to granuloma formation have been reported, and iatrogenic infections associated with wound dehiscence is common. Clinical signs of Sagenomella spp. infections are often vague and most cases cited report sudden death as a consistent sign. Thick-walled fungal hyphae are usually detected in impression smears from skin lesions. Staining with periodic acid-Schiff stain is usually confirmatory.

== Species ==
- Sagenomella alba
- Sagenomella bohemica
- Sagenomella chlamydospora
- Sagenomella diversispora
- Sagenomella griseoviridis
- Sagenomella humicola
- Sagenomella keratitidis
- Sagenomella ocotl
- Sagenomella oligospora
- Sagenomella ryukyuensis
- Sagenomella sagenomatis
- Sagenomella sclerotialis
- Sagenomella striatispora
- Sagenomella verticillata
