= Penicillium proteolyticum =

Scientific classification
- Kingdom: Fungi
- Division: Ascomycota
- Class: Eurotiomycetes
- Order: Eurotiales
- Family: Aspergillaceae
- Genus: Penicillium
- Species: P. proteolyticum

Binomial name
- Penicillium proteolyticum Kamyschko, O.P. 1961

Type strain
- ATCC 18326, CBS 303.67, FRR 3378, N 11a/10, NRRL 3378, VKM F-1137

Synonyms
- Talaromyces proteolyticus

Species of fungus

Penicillium proteolyticum is an anamorph species of fungus in the genus Penicillium which produces wortmannin.
