= Penicillium erythromellis =

Scientific classification
- Kingdom: Fungi
- Division: Ascomycota
- Class: Eurotiomycetes
- Order: Eurotiales
- Family: Aspergillaceae
- Genus: Penicillium
- Species: P. erythromellis

Binomial name
- Penicillium erythromellis A.D. Hocking 1979

Type strain
- CBS 644.80, FRR 1868, IFO 30688, IMI 216899, MUCL 38971, NBRC 30688, UAMH 9540

Synonyms
- Talaromyces erythromellis

Species of fungus

Penicillium erythromellis is an anamorph species of the genus of Penicillium.

== See also ==
- List of Penicillium species
