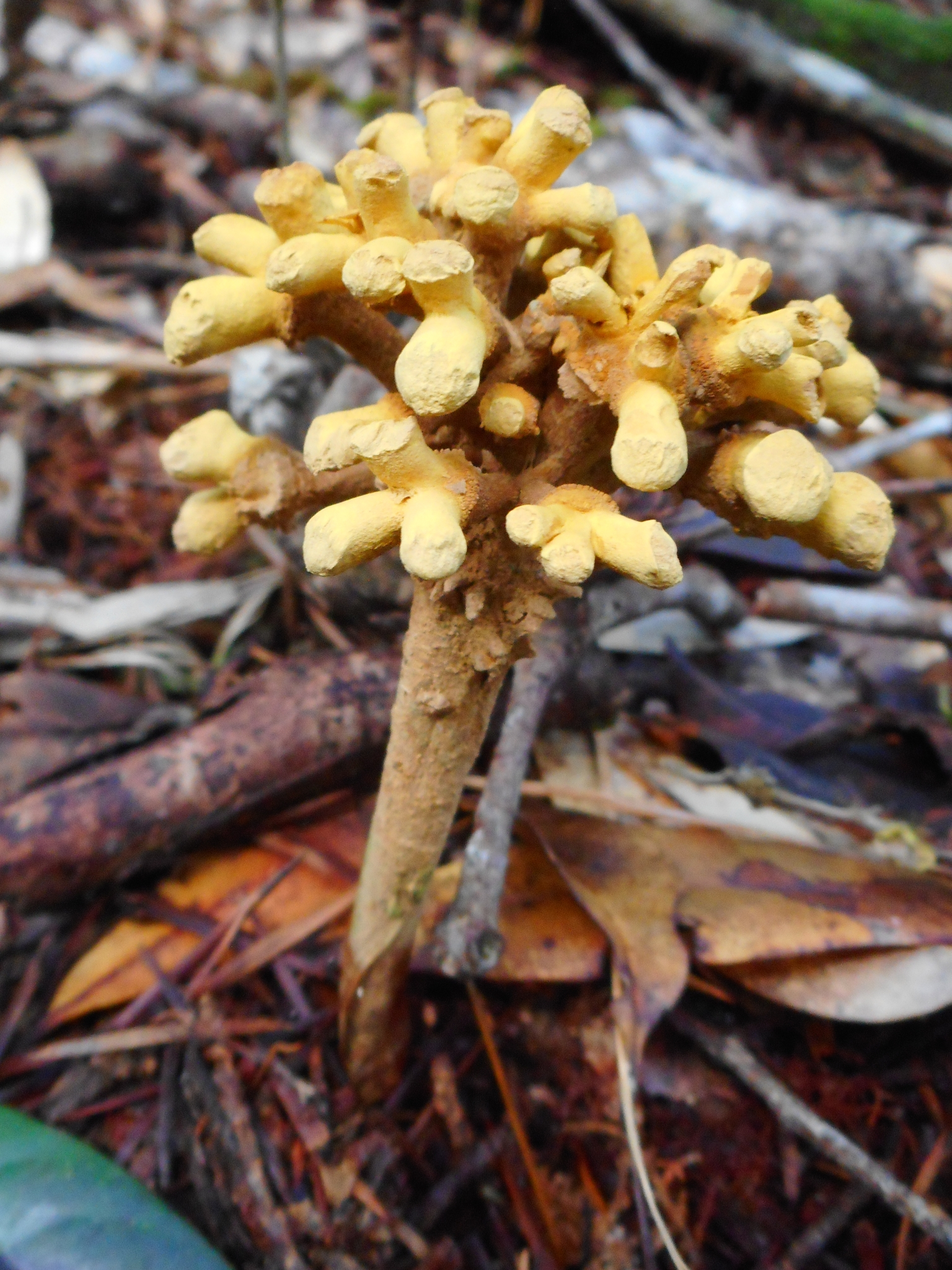

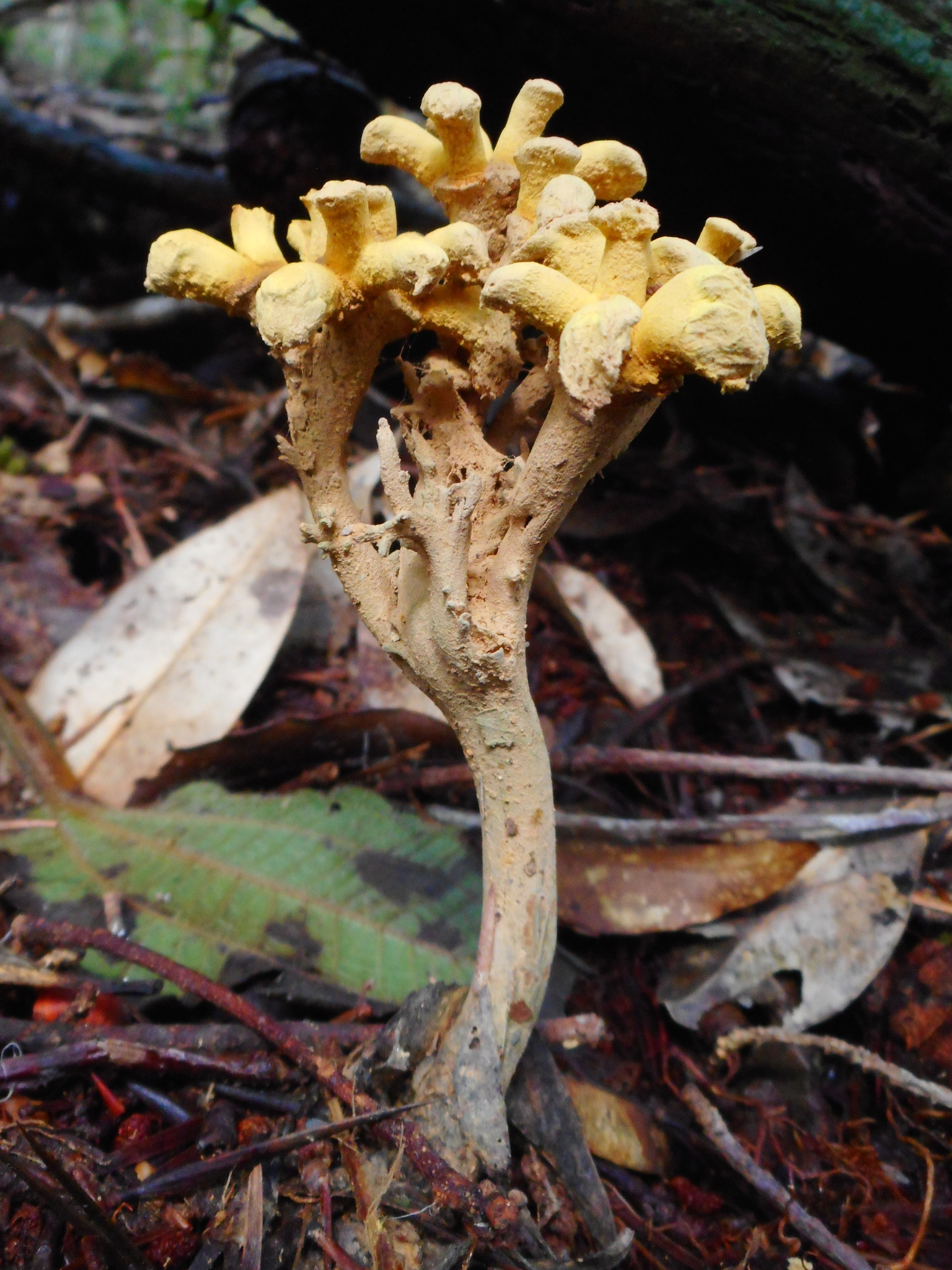

Scientific classification
- Domain: Eukaryota
- Kingdom: Fungi
- Division: Ascomycota
- Class: Eurotiomycetes
- Order: Eurotiales
- Family: Aspergillaceae
- Genus: Dendrosphaera; Pat. (1907)
- Species: D. eberhardtii

Binomial name
- Dendrosphaera eberhardtii Pat.

= Dendrosphaera =

Genus of fungi

Dendrosphaera is a monotypic genus of fungus in the family Aspergillaceae. It contains the single species Dendrosphaera eberhardtii.

== Taxonomy ==
Dendrosphaera eberhardtii was described in 1907 by Narcisse Théophile Patouillard.

== Description ==
The fruiting body of D. eberhardtii is a stiff, brown, branching root like structure with a 10–15 cm long, 3-6mm thick stem terminating in multiple 2-6mm thick sporulating heads that start white before maturing to golden yellow.

Spores: 8-10 μm. Globose with a large central droplet. They are smooth when still attached to the asci before developing encrustations that give them an echinulated appearance.

== Etymology ==
The genus name Dendrosphaera derives from the Latin dendroides or Greek dendroid meaning tree or tree-like and the Latin sphaericus meaning sphere shaped.

The specific epithet eberhardtii is named for Mr. Eberhardt who collected the specimens and created notes and illustrations of them in the field.

== Habitat and distribution ==
The specimens studied by Patouillard were collected in Tonkin, Vietnam where they were found growing from the ground in the Djirin forest at 1600 metres above sea level.

== Similar species ==
Trichocoma paradoxa is similar but produces only one 'brush' like feature whilst Dendrosphaera eberhardtii has several.
