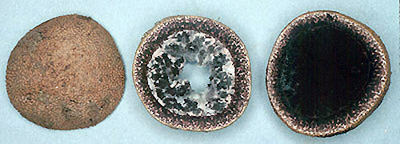
- Elaphomyces muricatus

Scientific classification
- Kingdom: Fungi
- Division: Ascomycota
- Class: Eurotiomycetes
- Order: Eurotiales
- Family: Elaphomycetaceae; Tul. ex Paol. (1889)

Type genus
- Elaphomyces Nees (1820)

Genera
- Elaphomyces; Pseudotulostoma

= Elaphomycetaceae =

Family of fungi

The Elaphomycetaceae are a family of fungi in the order Eurotiales. According to a 2008 estimate, the family contains two genera and 27 species.
