= Alsophila junghuhniana =

Scientific classification
- Kingdom: Plantae
- Clade: Tracheophytes
- Division: Polypodiophyta
- Class: Polypodiopsida
- Order: Cyatheales
- Family: Cyatheaceae
- Genus: Alsophila
- Species: A. junghuhniana

Binomial name
- Alsophila junghuhniana Kunze

Synonyms
- Alsophila debilis de Vriese ex Jungh.; Alsophila extensa Blume; Alsophila lunulata Blume non (G.Forst.) R.Br.; Alsophila melanopus Hassk.; Alsophila robusta de Vriese; Amphicosmia javanica (C.Presl) Moore; Cyathea alsophiliformis (Alderw.) Domin; Cyathea fallax (Alderw.) Domin; Cyathea glaucophylla (Alderw.) Domin; Cyathea junghuhniana (Kunze) Copel.; Cyathea melanopus Copel.; Cyathea merapiensis (Alderw.) Domin; Hemitelia alsophiliformis Alderw.; Hemitelia fallax Alderw.; Hemitelia glaucophylla Alderw.; Hemitelia javanica C.Presl; Hemitelia junghuhniana (Kunze) Mett.; Hemitelia latebrosa (Wall.) Mett.; Hemitelia merapiensis Alderw.; Hemitelia vrieseana Trevis.

Species of fern

Alsophila junghuhniana, synonym Cyathea junghuhniana, is a species of tree fern native to southern and central Sumatra and western Java, where it grows in forest at an altitude of 1000–2000 m. The trunk of this species is erect and may be 2 m tall or more. Fronds are tripinnate and up to about 3 m long. The stipes of this species are persistent and form a skirt around the trunk. They are brown, spiny, and covered with glossy, dark brown scales. Sori are borne near the midvein of fertile pinnules and are protected by thin indusia.

Large and Braggins (2004) note that A. junghuhniana has been confused with Alsophila crenulata (syn. Cyathea raciborskii), "from which it differs in several characteristics, including larger pinnae". Stipe outgrowths are present in A. crenulata, but absent from A. junghuhniana.

The specific epithet junghuhniana commemorates German botanist Friedrich Franz Wilhelm Junghuhn (1809-1864), who collected numerous plants on Java and Sumatra.
