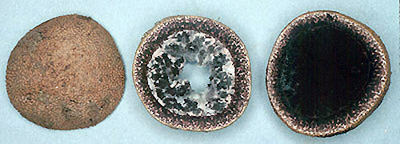
- Elaphomyces muricatus

Scientific classification
- Kingdom: Fungi
- Division: Ascomycota
- Class: Eurotiomycetes
- Order: Eurotiales
- Family: Elaphomycetaceae
- Genus: Elaphomyces; Nees (1820)

Type species
- Elaphomyces granulatus Fr. (1829)

Species
- 25, see text

Synonyms
- Hypogaeum Pers. (1797); Phymatium Chevall. (1826); Ceraunium Wallr. (1833); Ceratogaster Corda (1841); Lycoperdastrum Haller ex Kuntze (1891); Ascoscleroderma Clémencet (1932)

= Elaphomyces =

Genus of fungi

Elaphomyces (‘deer truffles’) is a genus of hypogeous fungi in the family Elaphomycetaceae. The widespread genus contains 25 truffle-like species. Elaphomyces is one of the most important ectomycorrhizal fungal genera in temperate and subarctic forest ecosystems. E. asperulus, E. granulatus, and E. muricatus were found to accumulate arsenic (12–660 mg/kg in dry mass); the composition of organoarsenicals is very unusual, with methylarsonic acid and trimethylarsine oxide as major As compounds.

== Species ==
- Elaphomyces aculeatus
- Elaphomyces anthracinus
- Elaphomyces citrinus
- Elaphomyces compleximurus
- Elaphomyces cyanosporus
- Elaphomyces digitatus
- Elaphomyces granulatus, known as deer balls, hart's balls, hart's truffles, or lycoperdon nuts (cf. Lycoperdon)
- Elaphomyces japonicus
- Elaphomyces leucosporus
- Elaphomyces leveillei
- Elaphomyces morettii
- Elaphomyces muricatus
- Elaphomyces officinalis
- Elaphomyces viridiseptum
