= Franz Wilhelm Junghuhn =

German-Dutch botanist and geologist

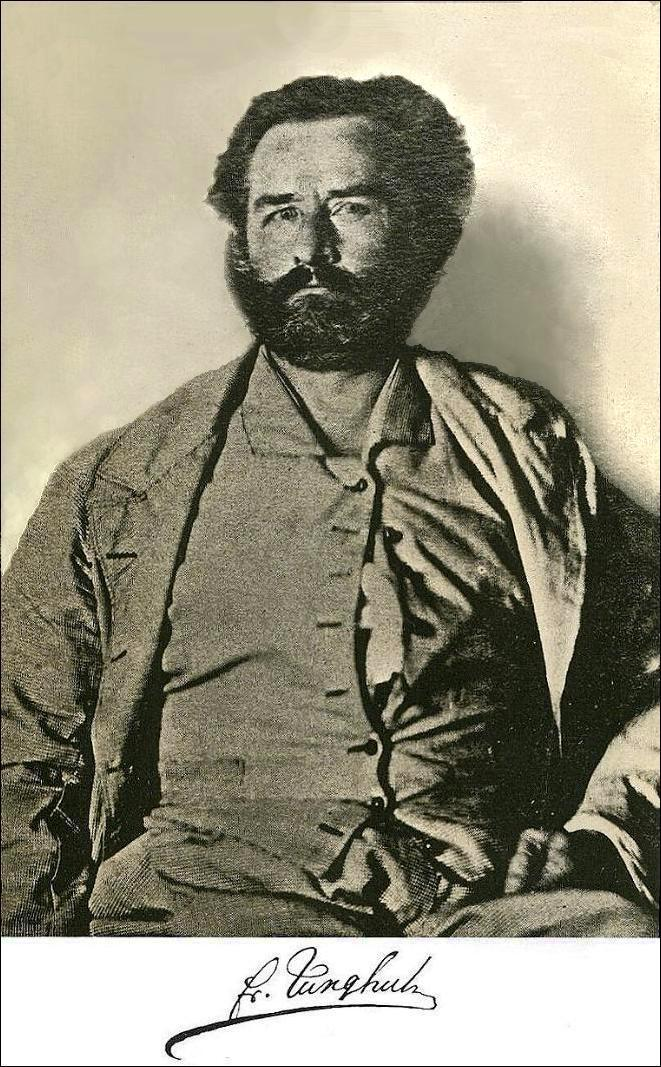
- Photograph taken in 1860
- Born: Friedrich Franz Wilhelm Junghuhn; 26 October 1809; Mansfeld, Westphalia (now Germany)
- Died: 24 April 1864 (aged 54); Lembang, West Java, Dutch East Indies
- Occupations: Botanist and geologist
- Years active: 1835-1864
- Known for: Botanical and geological studies in Dutch East Indies

Friedrich Franz Wilhelm Junghuhn was a German-born Dutch botanist and geologist. His father, Friedrich Junghuhn was a barber and a surgeon. His mother was Christine Marie Schiele. Junghuhn studied medicine in Halle and in Berlin from 1827 to 1831, meanwhile (1830) publishing a seminal paper on mushrooms in Linnaea. Ein Journal für Botanik.

== Early life ==
As a student Junghuhn was given to bouts of depression and he attempted suicide. He became involved in a 'matter of honor', and in the ensuing duel was himself hit, but perhaps unknown to him his opponent died of his wounds. Junghuhn fled by taking service in the Prussian army as a surgeon but was discovered and sentenced to ten years in prison. He feigned insanity, and was able to escape in the Autumn of 1833. He was briefly a member of the French Foreign Legion in North Africa but was dismissed on account of his poor health. At Paris, he sought out the famed Dutch botanist Christiaan Hendrik Persoon, who recommended that Junghuhn "enlist in the Dutch colonial army, and have yourself sent to the Dutch East Indies as a medical doctor". Junghuhn did so, leaving Europe (Hellevoetsluis) in the early Summer of 1835, arriving in Jakarta (then called "Batavia") on 13 October 1835.

== Java ==
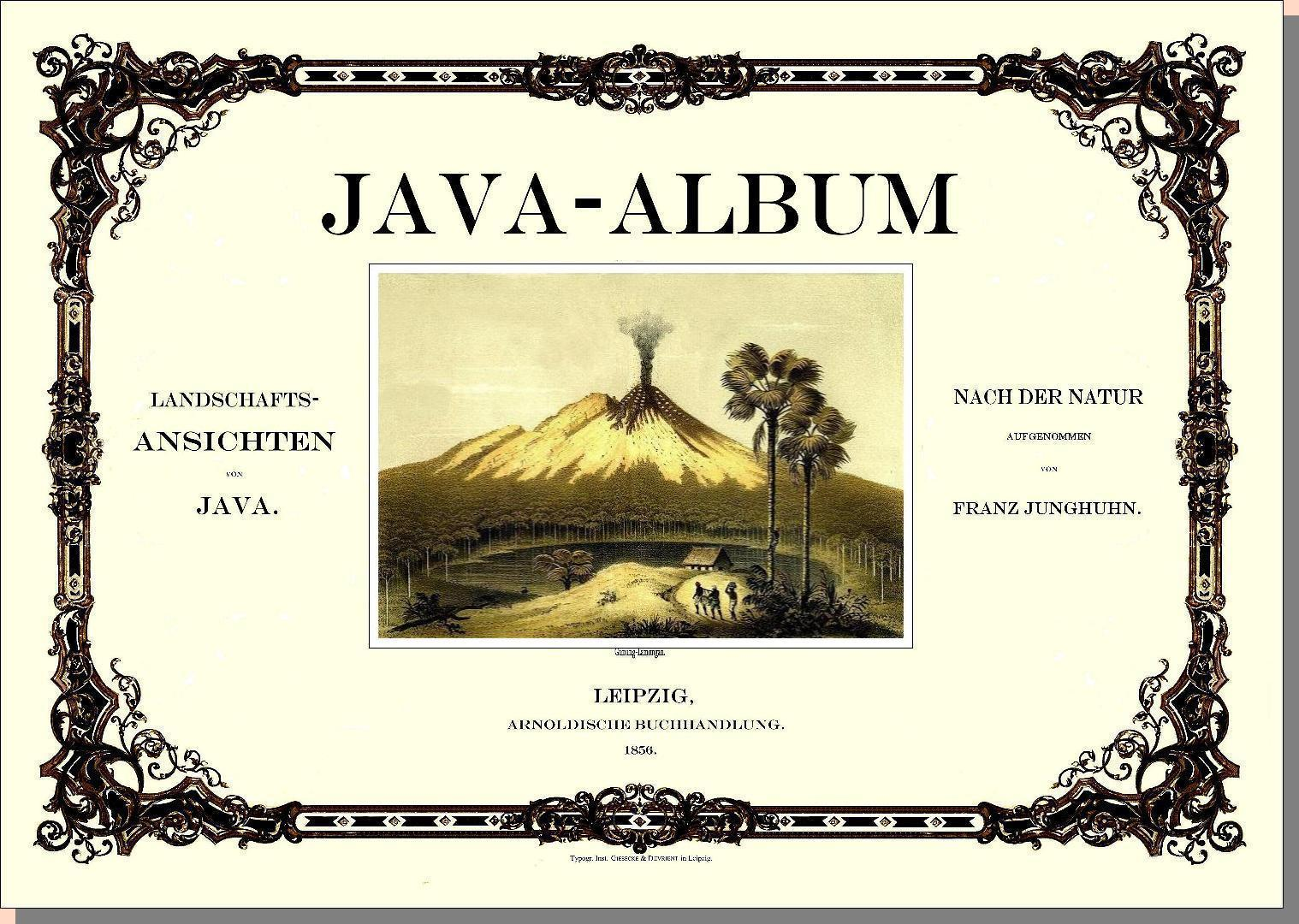
The landscape of Java's album by Junghuhn

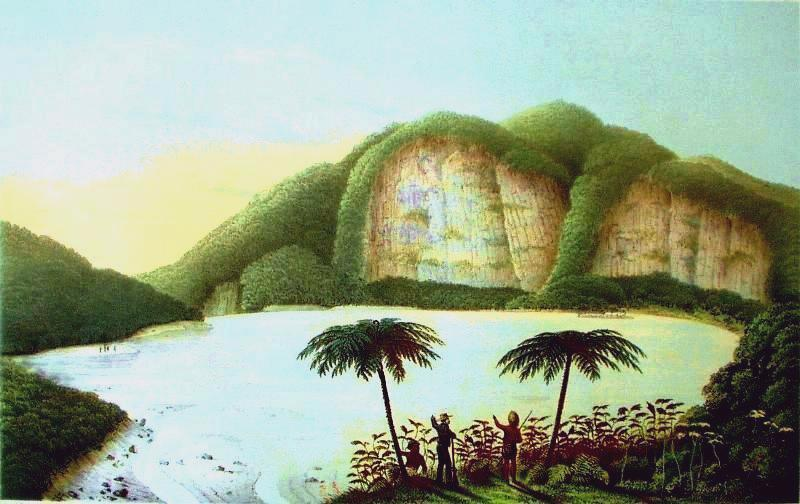
Lithograph of Kawah Putih

Junghuhn settled on Java, where he made an extensive study of the land and its people. He discovered the Kawah Putih crater lake south of Bandung in 1837. He published extensively on his many often highly adventurous expeditions and his scientific analyses. Among his works is an important description and natural history in many volumes of the volcanoes of Java, Bijdragen tot de geschiedenis der vulkanen in den Indischen Archipel (1843). He completed Die Topographischen und Naturwissenschaftlichen Reisen durch Java (Topographic and Scientific Journeys in Java) in 1845 and a first anthropological and topographical study of Sumatra, Die Bättalander auf Sumatra (Batak lands of Sumatra). in 1847. In 1849, ill health forced his return to the Netherlands, where he married Johanna Louisa Frederika Koch on 23 January 1850, and had a son. While in the Netherlands, Junghuhn began work on a four volume treatise published in Dutch and translated into German between 1850 and 1854: Java, deszelfs gedaante, bekleeding en inwendige struktuur (in German: Java, seine Gestalt, Pflanzendecke, und sein innerer Bau). Junghuhn was an avid humanist and socialist. In the Netherlands he published anonymously his free-thinking manifesto Licht- en Schaduwbeelden uit de Binnenlanden van Java (Images of Light and Shadow from Java's interior) between 1853 and 1855. The work was controversial, advocating socialism in the colonies and fiercely criticizing Christian and Islamic proselytization of the Javanese people. Junghuhn instead wrote of his preference for a form of Pandeism (pantheistic deism), contending that God was in everything, but could only be determined through reason. The work was banned in Austria and parts of Germany for its "denigrations and vilifications of Christianity", but was a strong seller in the Netherlands where it was first published pseudonymously. It was also popular in colonial Indonesia, despite opposition from the Dutch Christian Church there. The publisher of the first volume, Jacobus Hazenberg, refused to continue his association with the work; the remaining four were published by the outspoken liberal, Frans Günst, from volume three as installments (from 1 October 1855) of the newly founded journal for freethinkers, De Dageraad (Dawn). In 1855 Junghuhn became a corresponding member of the Royal Netherlands Academy of Arts and Sciences.

Recovered from his ills, Junghuhn returned to Java in 1855. Highly interested in botany and its practical applications, he (together with J.E. de Vrij of Bandung) became embroiled in a bitter and extended controversy with Johannes Elias Teijsmann, hortulanus of 's Lands Plantentuin at Buitenzorg (now Bogor) and J.C. Hasskarl about the effectiveness of Cinchona species in the treatment of malaria. This controversy was conducted in public and in print with open letters to and demands on "Het Natuurkundig Genootschap"; part of this exchange of minds can be followed in Natuurkundig Tijdschrift voor Nederlandsch Indië from 1862 onwards. At his direction massive plantation of Cinchona was carried out in Java, making it leading producer of Kina (Cinchona bark). He remained on Java until his death from liver disease in 1864. On his deathbed in his house near Lembang on the slopes of the volcano Tangkuban Perahu just north of Bandung, Java, Junghuhn asked the doctor to open the windows, so he could say goodbye to the mountains that he loved. In Lembang, there is a small monument to his memory in a grassy square named after him planted with some of his favorite trees among which the Cinchona. A minor item of trivia playing into polemical discussions of Junghuhn is his surname, literally translated as "young chicken".

== Botanical and mycological legacy ==
The fungal genus Junghuhnia, and the plants Cyathea junghuhniana and Nepenthes junghuhnii are named after Franz Junghuhn.

Specimens collected by Junghuhn are cared for in herbaria across the world, including the Naturalis Biodiversity Center, Kew Herbarium, Muséum national d'Histoire naturelle and National Herbarium of Victoria (MEL), Royal Botanic Gardens Victoria.

== Gallery ==
Note that most images are lithographs after original drawings by Junghuhn

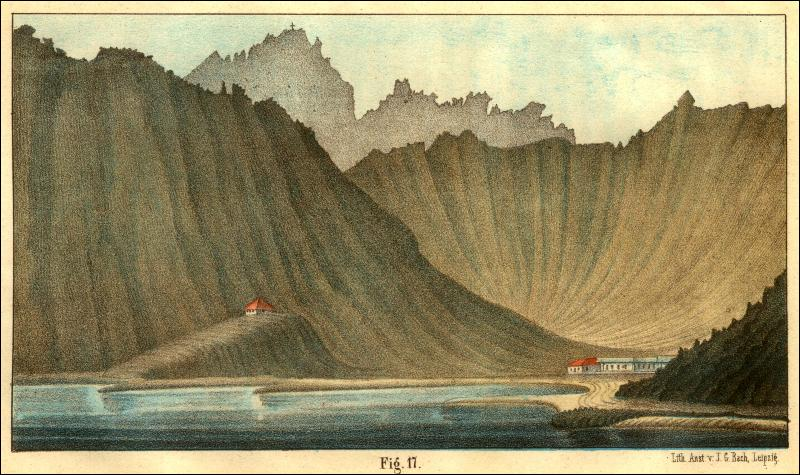
Gulf of Aden

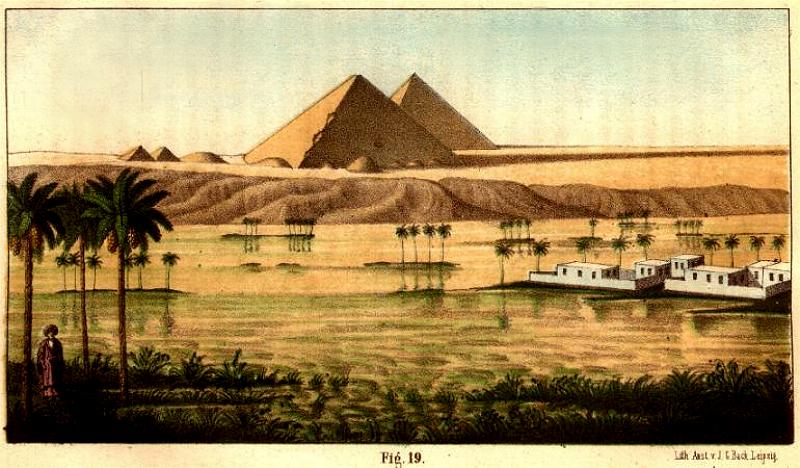
The Pyramids of Giza

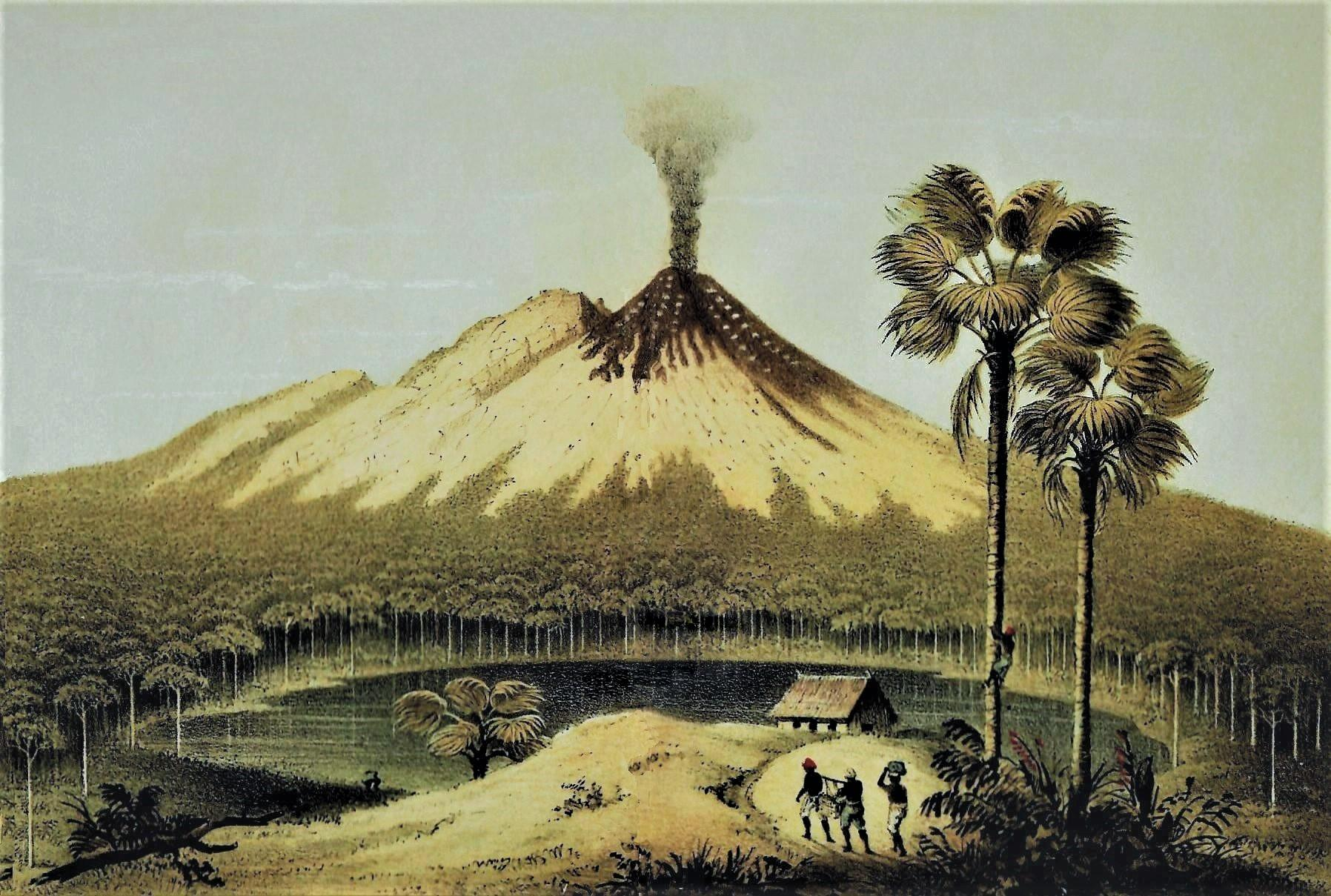
Mount Lamongan

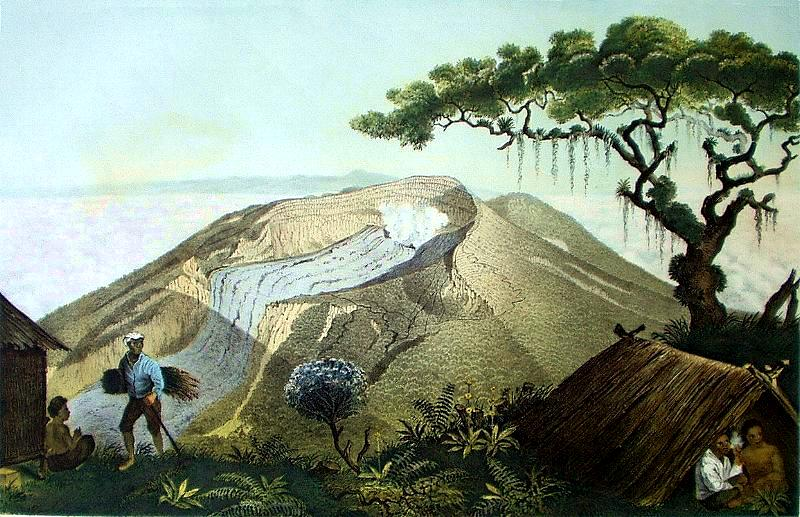
Mount Gede

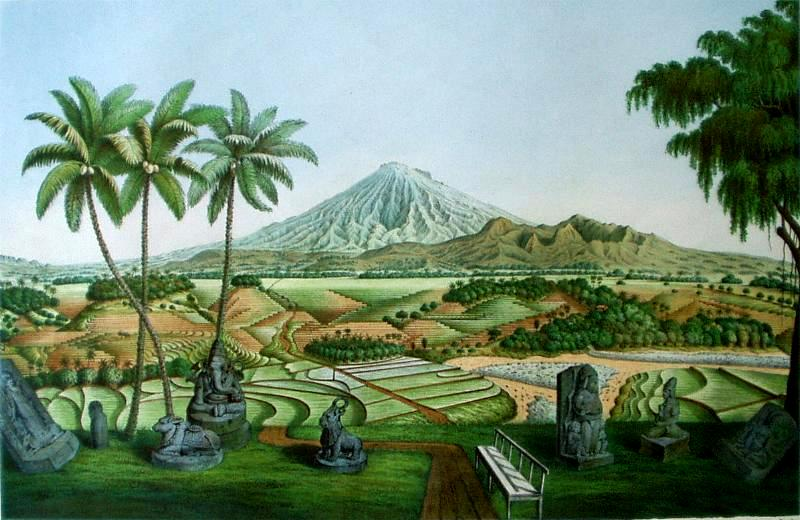
Mount Sumbing

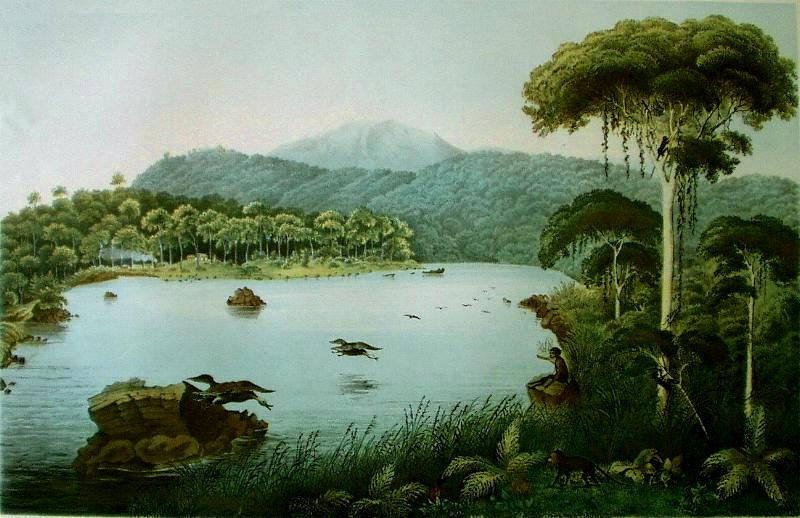
Patengan Lake.

Mount Guntur

Mount Gamping

Southern coast of Java

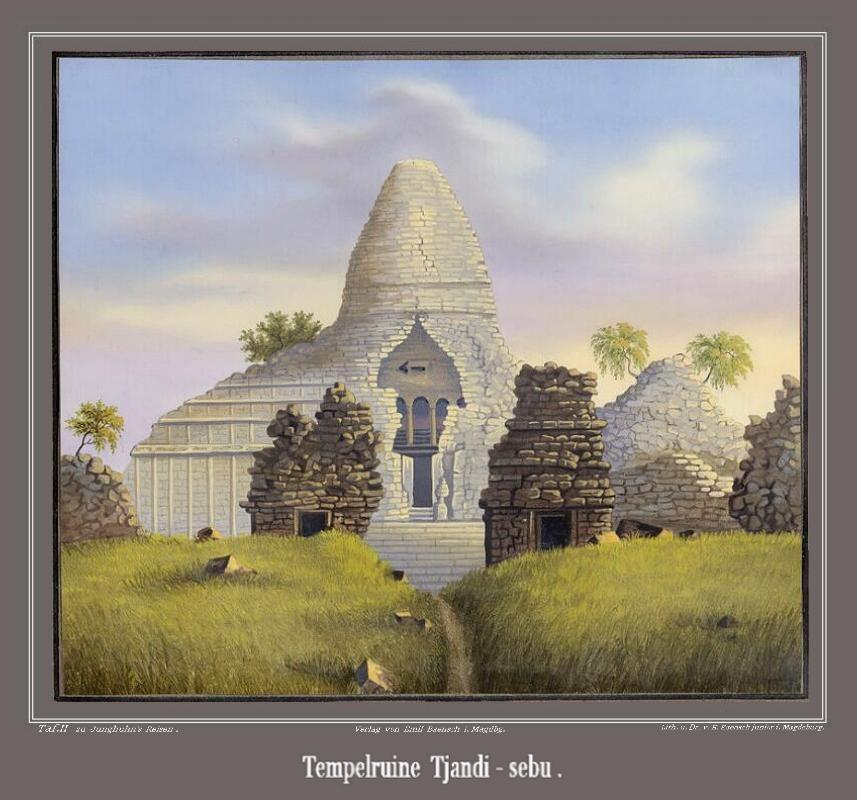
Candi Sebu

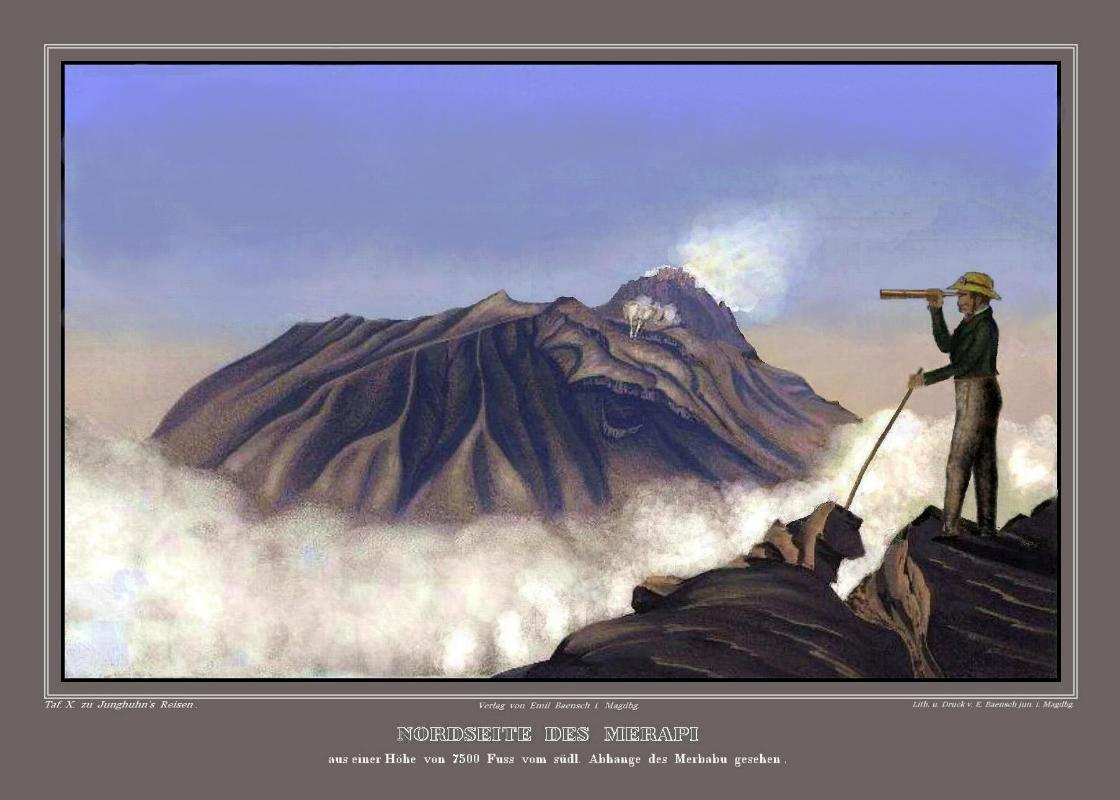
Junghuhn in Mount Merapi

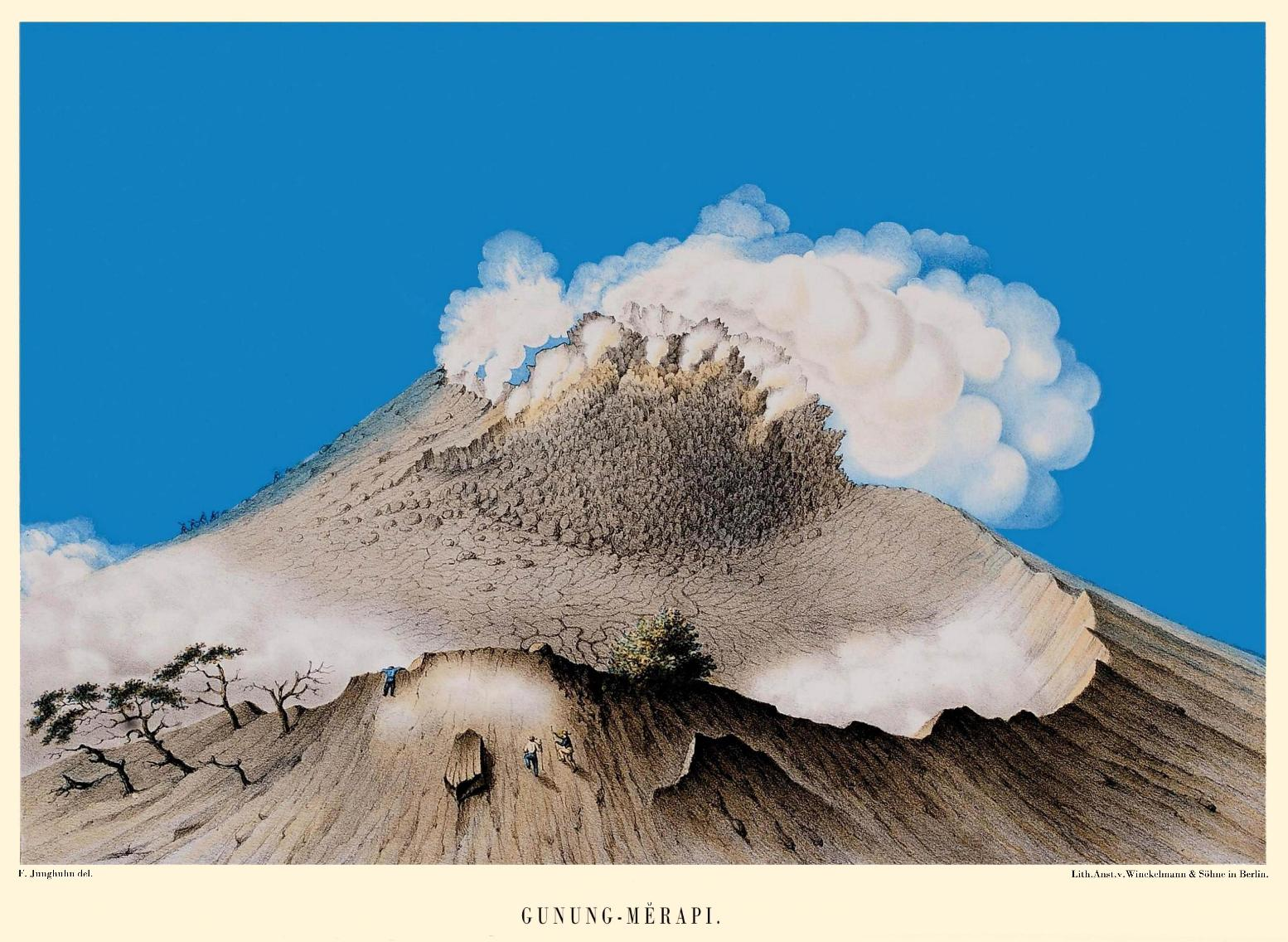
Mount Merapi

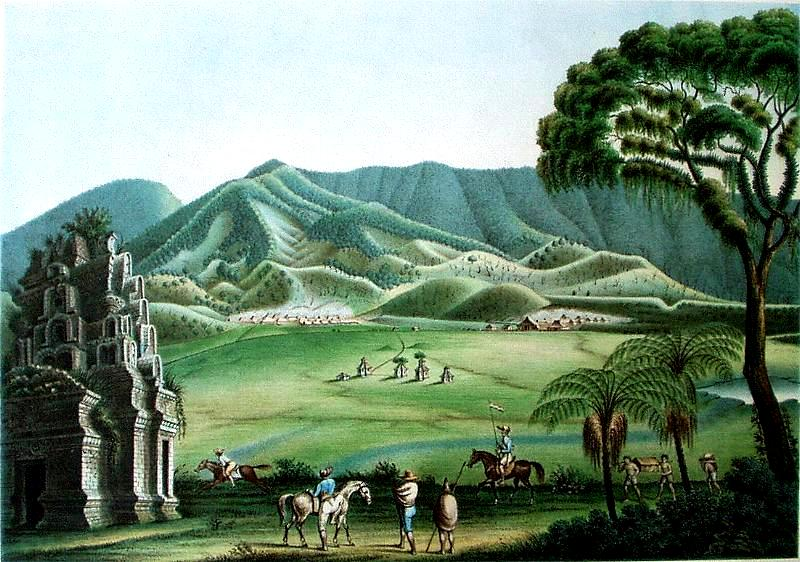
Dieng Plateau

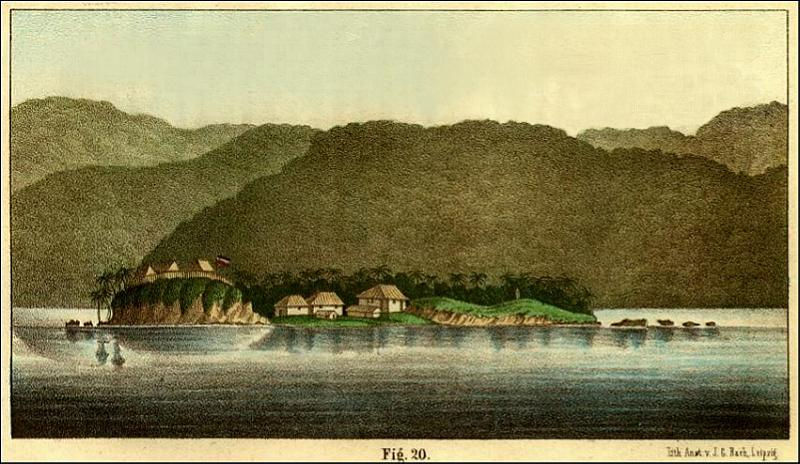
The island Pontjang Kitjil (Poncang Kecil) in Tapanulibaai (now Teluk Sibolga)

== Bibliography ==
- Franz Junghuhn. Biographische Beiträge zur 100. Wiederkehr seines Geburtstages, ed. Max. C.P. Schmidt, Leipzig: Dürr'schen Buchhandlung, 1909.
- F. Junghuhn. Gedenkboek 1809-1909, De Junghuhn-Commissie, 's-Gravenhage: Martinus Nijhoff, 1910.
- Java's onuitputtelijke natuur. Reisverhalen, tekeningen en fotografieën van Franz Wilhelm Junghuhn, ed. Rob Nieuwenhuys and Frits Jaquet, Alphen aan den Rijn: A.W. Stijthof, 1980.

A novel about Junghuhn's life is: C.W. Wormser, Frans Junghuhn, Deventer: W. van Hoeve, 1942.
