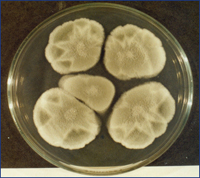
- Culture of Penicillium purpurogenum

Scientific classification
- Kingdom: Fungi
- Division: Ascomycota
- Class: Eurotiomycetes
- Order: Eurotiales
- Family: Trichocomaceae; E.Fisch. (1897)

Type genus
- Trichocoma Jungh. (1838)

Genera
- Acidotalaromyces; Ascospirella; Dendrosphaera; Rasamsonia; Sagenomella; Talaromyces; Thermomyces; Trichocoma

= Trichocomaceae =

Family of fungi

The Trichocomaceae are a family of fungi in the order Eurotiales. Taxa are saprobes with aggressive colonization strategies, adaptable to extreme environmental conditions. Family members are cosmopolitan in distribution, ubiquitous in soil, and common associates of decaying plant and food material.

== Taxonomy ==
When first described, the family contained some of the most familiar fungi, such as Penicillium and Aspergillus. In 2011, it was proposed, that the family should be split into the three families Aspergillaceae, Thermoascaceae and Trichocomaceae.

In an updated phylogeny of the Eurotiales published in 2020, there were 8 genera included in the Trichocomaceae. Several more genera are connected to the Trichocomaceae in the Mycobank database, some of which await clarification of their standing.

- Aspergillopsis
- Chaetosartorya
- Chaetotheca
- Cladosarum
- Cleistosoma
- Edyuillia
- Hemisartorya
- Neocarpenteles
- Neopetromyces
- Neosartorya
- Petromyces
- Phialosimplex
- Polypaecilum
- Redaellia
- Sagonema
- Sphaeromyces
- Sporophormis
- Stilbodendron
- Stilbothamnium
- mitosporic Trichocomaceae
