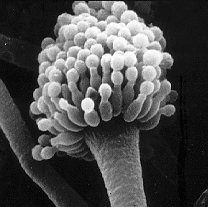
- Aspergillus

Scientific classification
- Kingdom: Fungi
- Division: Ascomycota
- Class: Eurotiomycetes
- Subclass: Eurotiomycetidae
- Order: Eurotiales; G.W.Martin ex Benny & Kimbr. (1980)

Families
- Aspergillaceae; Elaphomycetaceae; Penicillaginaceae; Thermoascaceae; Trichocomaceae

= Eurotiales =

Order of fungi

The Eurotiales are an order of sac fungi, also known as the green and blue molds. It was circumscribed in 1980.

== Classification ==
Phylogeny of Eurotiales

- Eurotiales
  - - - Aspergillaceae
      - Thermoascaceae
    - - Trichocomaceae
      - Elaphomycetaceae
  - Penicillaginaceae

Currently the order Eurotiales contains 5 families, 28 genera and 1280 species:

- Family Aspergillaceae Link [=Monascaceae J. Schröt.]
  - Aspergillago Samson, Houbraken & Frisvad – 1 species
  - Aspergillus P. Micheli ex Haller – 428 species
  - Dichlaena Durieu & Mont. – 4 species
  - Hamigera Stolk & Samson – 9 species
  - Leiothecium Samson & Mouch. – 2 species
  - Monascus Tiegh. – 38 species
  - Penicilliopsis Solms – 15 species
  - Penicillium Link – 467 species
  - Phialomyces P.C. Misra & P.H.B. Talbot – 5 species
  - Pseudohamigera Houbraken, Frisvad & Samson – 1 species
  - Pseudopenicillium Guevara-Suarez, Cano & Guarro – 3 species
  - Sclerocleista Subram. – 2 species
  - Xerochrysium Pitt – 2 species
  - Xeromyces Fraser – 1 species
- Family Elaphomycetaceae Tul. ex Paol.
  - Elaphomyces Nees – 101 species
  - Pseudotulostoma O.K. Miller & T. Henkel – 2 species
- Family Penicillaginaceae Houbraken, Frisvad & Samson
  - Penicillago M. Guevara-Suarez, J. Gené & D. García – 4 species
- Family Thermoascaceae Apinis
  - Paecilomyces Bainier – 10 species
  - Thermoascus Miehe – 5 species
- Family Trichocomaceae E. Fisch.
  - Acidotalaromyces Houbraken et al. – 1 species
  - Ascospirella Houbraken et al. – 1 species
  - Dendrosphaera Pat. – 1 species
  - Evansstolkia Houbraken et al. – 1 species
  - Rasamsonia Houbraken & Frisvad – 11 species
  - Sagenomella W. Gams – 8 species
  - Talaromyces C.R. Benj. – 149 species
  - Thermomyces Tsikl. – 6 species
  - Trichocoma Jungh. – 2 species
