= Monascus kaoliang =

Scientific classification
- Kingdom: Fungi
- Division: Ascomycota
- Class: Eurotiomycetes
- Order: Eurotiales
- Family: Aspergillaceae
- Genus: Monascus
- Species: M. kaoliang

Binomial name
- Monascus kaoliang C.F.Lin & Iizuka (1975)

Species of fungus

Monascus kaoliang is a fungus.
