= Bruceomyces =

Scientific classification
- Domain: Eukaryota
- Kingdom: Fungi
- Division: Ascomycota
- Class: Lecanoromycetes
- Order: Lecanorales
- Family: Bruceomycetaceae
- Genus: Bruceomyces; Rikkinen (2012)
- Species: B. castoris

Binomial name
- Bruceomyces castoris (Rikkinen) Rikkinen (2012)

Synonyms
- Brucea Rikkinen (2003)

Genus of fungi

Bruceomyces is a fungal genus in the family Bruceomycetaceae, containing the single species Bruceomyces castoris.

== Taxonomy ==
A monotypic genus, Bruceomyces contains the single species Bruceomyces castoris. Brucea is the original name of Bruceomyces, published by Finnish mycologist Jouko Rikkinen in 2003. Rikkinen and colleagues renamed the genus in 2012 after it was discovered that Brucea was a junior homonym of a plant genus. The generic name honors lichenologist Bruce McCune (b.1952), who studied western North American lichen flora. The specific epithet castoris means "beaver", "which play an important role in the ecology of resinicolous fungi in the Pacific Northwest". The family Bruceomycetaceae was circumscribed to contain Bruceomyces as well as Resinogalea, another resinicolous (resin-loving) fungus.

== Description ==
Consisting of a rounded protuberance (the capillitium) at the end of a straight or curved thin brownish-black stalk, the fruit body ranges from 0.8 to 3 mm tall. The capillitium is typically 0.20–0.31 mm in diameter, while the stalk thickness is 85–135 μm. The thick-walled asci (spore-bearing cells) are club-shaped, measuring 15–20 by 7–9 μm, set upon stalks that are 20–25 μm. Spores are pale brown, ellipsoidal, and measure 7.0–8.3 by 4.4–5.1 μm. The spore walls have longitudinal wrinkles that can be visualized with light microscopy. Paraphyses are 2.5–3.5 μm thick and have thick septa (cross-walls). Bruceomyces castoris is a calicioid fungus, meaning that it releases a powdery spore mass (the mazaedium) on the surface of the apothecium.

== Habitat and distribution ==
Bruceomyces castoris was isolated from the sap and chewed wood found in beaver teeth scars at the base of living grand fir trees in a wooded area by a beaver pond in Polk County, Oregon. Other trees in the area included Douglas fir (Pseudotsuga menziesii), Oregon maple (Acer macrophyllum), and red alder (Alnus rubra).
