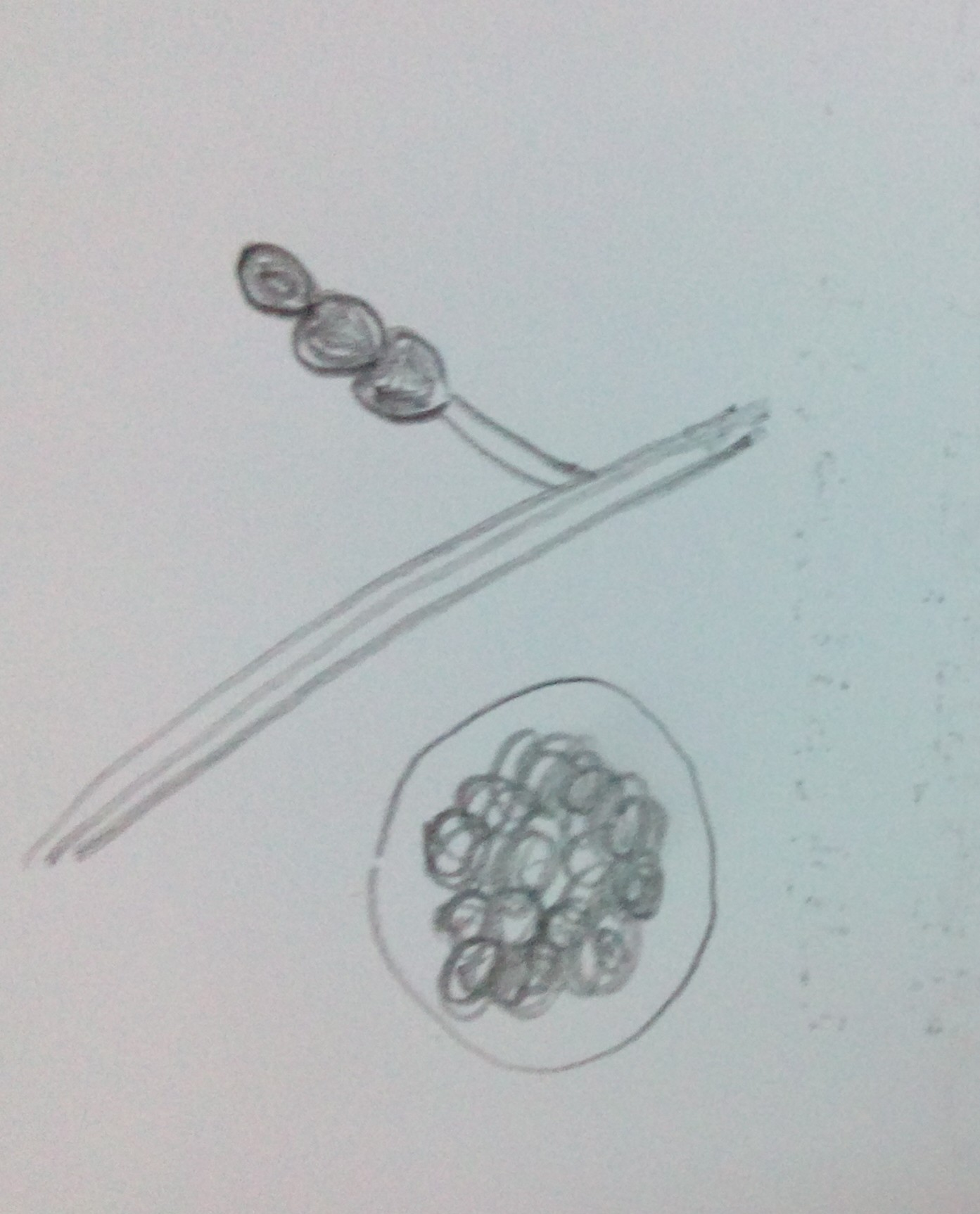

Scientific classification
- Domain: Eukaryota
- Kingdom: Fungi
- Division: Ascomycota
- Class: Eurotiomycetes
- Order: Eurotiales
- Family: Aspergillaceae
- Genus: Monascus
- Species: M. pallens

Binomial name
- Monascus pallens P.F. Cannon, Abdullah & B.A. Abbas

= Monascus pallens =

Species of fungus

Monascus pallens is a fungal species in the Aspergillaceae family. It was found during a survey done on water and sediment of the Shatt al-Arab river in Basra, Iraq. The research was done by Basil A. Abbas under supervision of SK. Abdullah in 1995.
