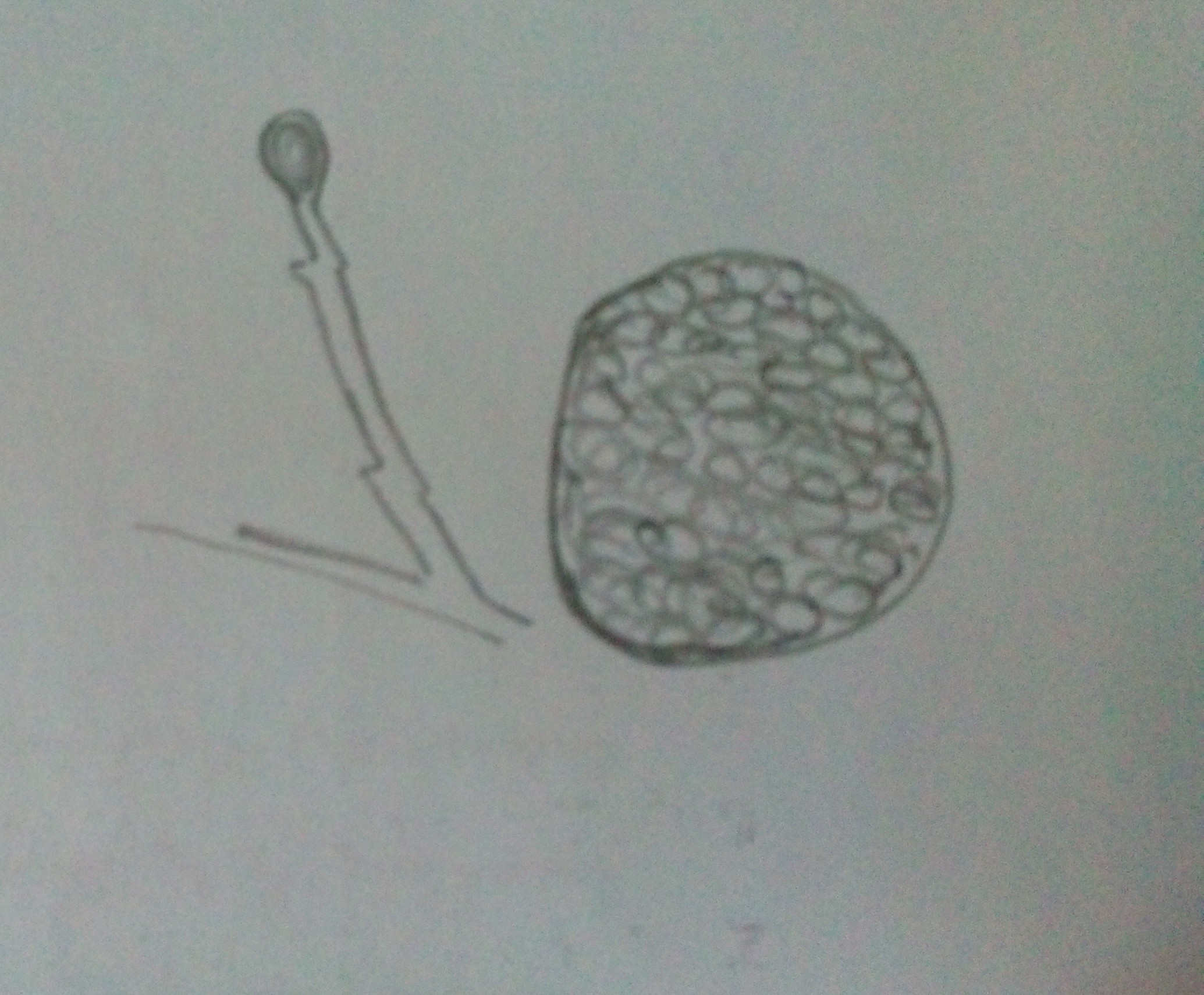

Scientific classification
- Domain: Eukaryota
- Kingdom: Fungi
- Division: Ascomycota
- Class: Eurotiomycetes
- Order: Eurotiales
- Family: Aspergillaceae
- Genus: Monascus
- Species: M. sanguineus

Binomial name
- Monascus sanguineus P.F.Cannon, Abdullah & B.A.Abbas (1995)

= Monascus sanguineus =

Species of fungus

Monascus sanguineus is a fungal species in the family Aspergillaceae. It was found during a survey done on water and sediment of river Shatt al-Arab at Basra city, southern Iraq. The research was done by Basil Abbas under supervision of S.K. Abdullah in 1995.
