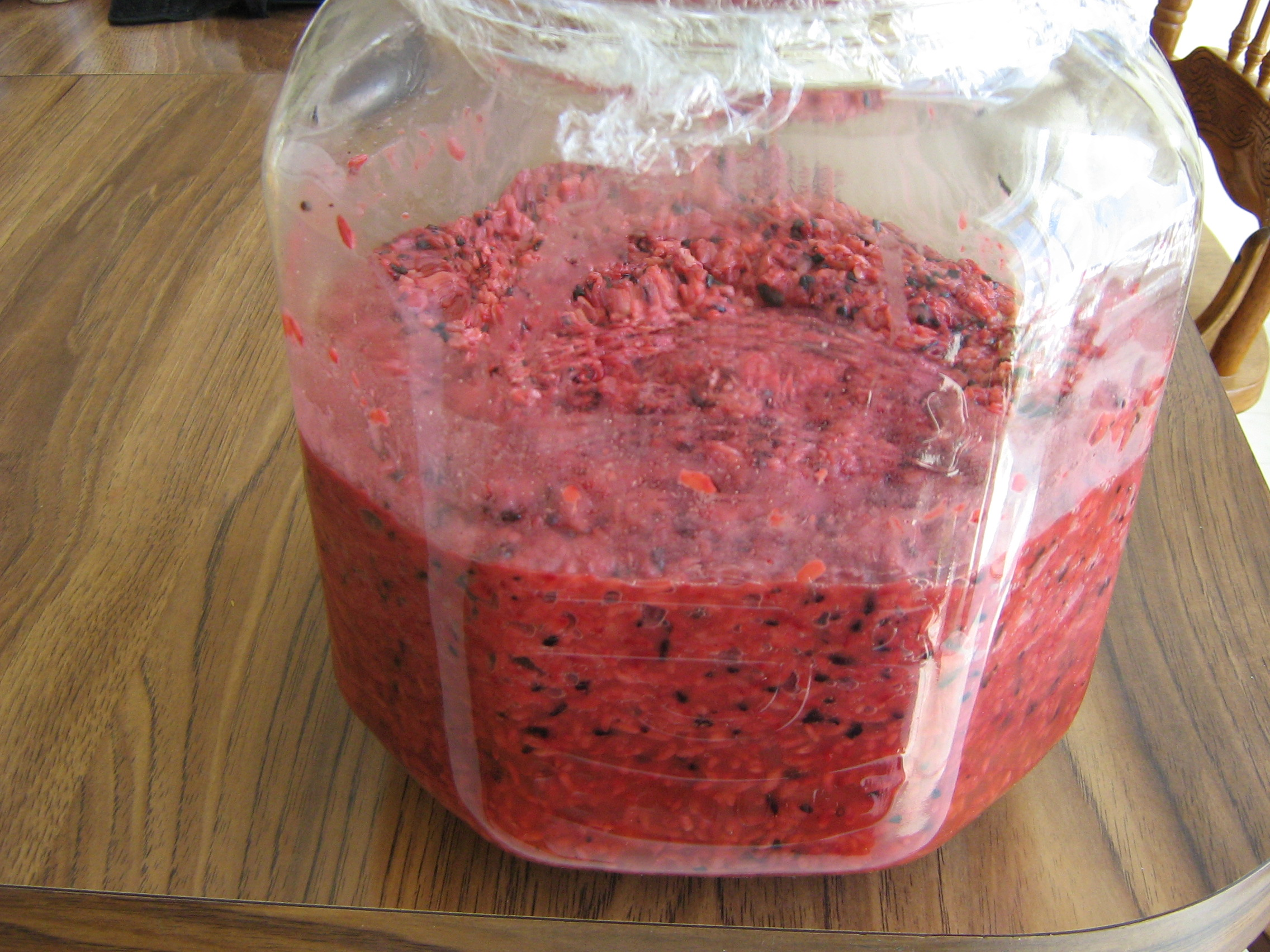
- Monascus purpureus being used to make red rice wine

Scientific classification
- Kingdom: Fungi
- Division: Ascomycota
- Class: Eurotiomycetes
- Order: Eurotiales
- Family: Aspergillaceae
- Genus: Monascus; Tiegh. (1884)

Type species
- Monascus ruber

Synonyms
- Allescheria Sacc. & P.Syd. (1899); Backusia Thirum., M.D.Whitehead & P.N.Mathur (1965); Eurotiella Lindau (1900); Eurotiopsis Costantin ex Laborde (1897); Physomyces Harz (1890)

= Monascus =

Genus of fungi

Monascus is a genus of mold. Among the known species of this genus, the red-pigmented Monascus purpureus is among the most important because of its use in the production of certain fermented foods in East Asia, particularly China and Japan. It has also been found associated with the nests of some bee species, particularly bumblebees and sweat bees though its function in these environments is unclear.

== Species ==
- Monascus albidulus Zhong Q.Li & F. Guo (2004)
- Monascus argentinensis Stchigel & Guarro (2004)
- Monascus aurantiacus Zhong Q.Li ex Zhong Q.Li & F.Guo (2004)
- Monascus barkeri P.A.Dang. (1907)
- Monascus eremophilus A.D.Hocking & Pitt (1988)
- Monascus flavipigmentosus R.N.Barbosa, Souza-Motta, N.T.Oliveira & Houbraken (2017)
- Monascus floridanus P.F.Cannon & E.L.Barnard (1987)
- Monascus fumeus Zhong Q.Li & F. Guo (2004)
- Monascus lunisporas Udagawa & H. Baba (1998)
- Monascus mellicola R.N.Barbosa, Souza-Motta, N.T.Oliveira & Houbraken (2017)
- Monascus mucoroides Tiegh. (1884)
- Monascus olei Piedallu (1910)
- Monascus pallens P.F. Cannon, Abdullah & B.A.Abbas (1995)
- Monascus paxii Lingelsh. (1916)
- Monascus pilosus K.Satô ex D. Hawksw. & Pitt (1983)
- Monascus purpureus Went (1895)
- Monascus recifensis R.N. Barbosa, Souza-Motta, N.T.Oliveira & Houbraken (2017)
- Monascus ruber Tiegh. (1884)
- Monascus rutilus Zhong Q.Li & F.Guo (2004)
- Monascus sanguineus P.F.Cannon, Abdullah & B.A.Abbas (1995)
- Monascus vini Săvul. & Hulea (1953)

== Phylogeny ==
Phylogeny as given by Bisby et al., 2000, who put the genus into a separate family Monascaceae.

- Monascaceae
  - Monascus
    - Monascus kaoliang
    - Monascus pilosus
    - Monascus aurantiacus
    - Monascus floridanus
    - Monascus eremophilus
    - Monascus ruber
    - Monascus purpureus
    - Monascus argentinensis
  - Basipetospora
  - Xeromyces
  - Fraseriella

== Monascus pigments and biosynthesis ==
Monascus purpureus derives its signature red color from mosascus pigment that is composed of azaphilones or secondary fungal metabolites. There are six primary compounds all with similar biosynthetic pathways, two yellow pigments, ankaflavin and monascin, two orange pigments monascorubin and rubropunctatin, and two red pigments monascorubinamine and rubropunctaimine. All six are produced with a combination of polyketide synthase (PKS) and fatty acid synthase (FAS) In the first step a hexekatide is formed through Type 1 PKS encoded by the Mripig A gene. PKS uses the domains acyl transferase, acetyl-CoA, ketoacyl synthase, acyl transferase, acyl carrier protein and the base units of acetyl-CoA and malonyl-CoA to produce a ketone chain that undergoes Knoevenagel aldol condensations. The second step is the formation of a fatty acid through the FAS pathway. The β-keto acid then undergoes a trans-esterification reaction to form one of the two orange pigments. At this point the compound can either undergo reduction to form one of the yellow pigments or amination to form one of the red pigments.
