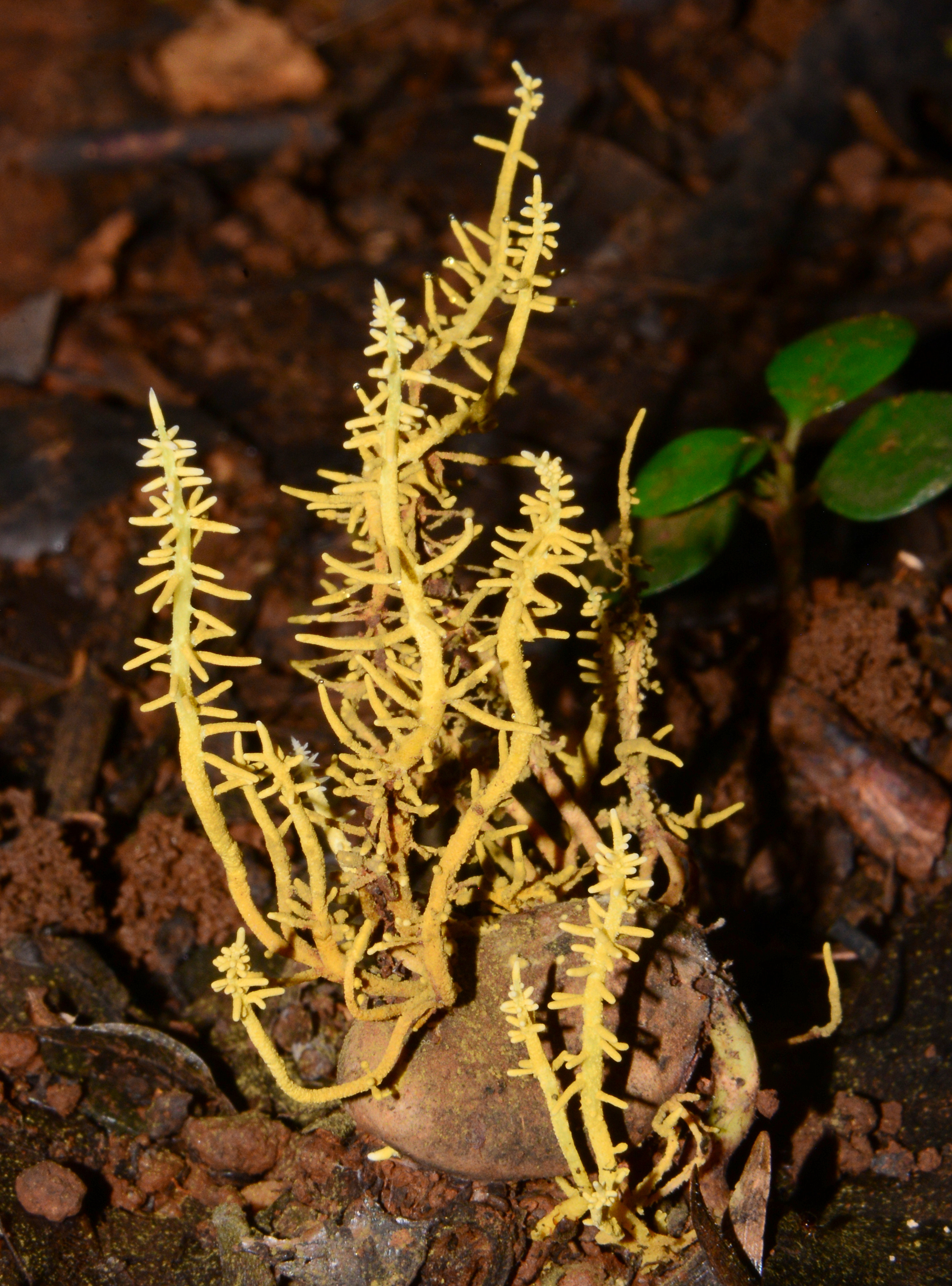

Scientific classification
- Kingdom: Fungi
- Division: Ascomycota
- Class: Eurotiomycetes
- Order: Eurotiales
- Family: Aspergillaceae
- Genus: Penicilliopsis; Solms (1887)

Type species
- Penicilliopsis clavariiformis Solms (1887)

= Penicilliopsis =

Genus of fungi

Penicilliopsis is a genus of fungi in the family Aspergillaceae.

== Taxonomy ==
This genus was created by the German botanist Hermann zu Solms-Laubach in 1887 when he described the type species Penicilliopsis clavariiformis (originally Penicilliopsis clavariaeformis) as new to science. The species was observed growing from the fallen fruit of Diospyros macrophylla in Java.

== Species ==
As of March 2023, Species Fungorum accepted nine species of Penicilliopsis.

- Phaeopterula anomala
- Penicilliopsis africana
- Penicilliopsis bambusae
- Penicilliopsis brasiliensis
- Penicilliopsis clavariiformis
- Penicilliopsis ledermannii
- Penicilliopsis palmicola
- Penicilliopsis pseudocordyceps
- Penicilliopsis zonata
