= Bruceomycetaceae =

Scientific classification
- Kingdom: Fungi
- Division: Ascomycota
- Class: Lecanoromycetes
- Order: Lecanorales
- Family: Bruceomycetaceae; Rikkinen & A.R.Schmidt (2016)

Type genus
- Bruceomyces Rikkinen (2012)

Genera
- Bruceomyces; Resinogalea

Family of fungi

Bruceomycetaceae is a small family of fungi in the order Lecanorales. It contains two genera, each of which contains a single species.

== Taxonomy ==
The family was circumscribed by lichenologists Jouko Rikkinen and Alexander Roland Schmidt in 2016 to contain the type genus, Bruceomyces, and the genus Resinogalea. Both genera are monotypic–containing a single species. Bruceomyces castoris was originally described by Rikkinen in 2003 as Brucea castoris, but was transferred to the newly circumscribed Bruceomyces in 2012 after it was discovered that Brucea was a junior homonym of a plant genus. The genus name Bruceomyces honours American lichenologist Bruce McCune. Resinogalea humboldtensis was described as a species new to science in 2016.

The authors placed Bruceomyces and Resinogalea in the same family due to their similar physical characteristics, and their similar substrate and habitat ecology. Their dissimilarity in spore structure was the justification for creating a new genus for Resinogalea humboldtensis. The authors were not, however, able to successfully extract DNA from specimens of either genera, and they acknowledge that "inclusion of Bruceomyces and Resinogalea into the same family does not resolve the phylogenetic position of these enigmatic fungi", and they suggest that some morphological similarities with fungi of Coniocybomycetes could warrant further investigation of phylogenetic affinities. Bruceomycetaceae was originally circumscribed without placing it in any lineage at a higher taxonomic level (i.e., Ascomycota incertae sedis); overviews of fungal classification published since then (2018 and 2020) have placed the family in the order Lecanorales.

== Description ==
Bruceomycetaceae species have stalked ascomata that are capitate (i.e., with a distinct compact head termed a capitulum). An excipulum (a ring-shaped layer surrounding the hymenium) is atop the ascoma; it is formed as an extension of the stalk's outer layers. The slender stalk is made of hyphae that are arranged periclinally (parallel to the surface). The asci (spore-bearing structures) are formed with croziers; they are broadly club-shaped with a stalk, containing eight spores that are often arranged in two rows. At maturity, the asci release the ascospores in a powdery mass atop the capitulum.

The structure of the ascospores is the primary characteristic separating genus Bruceomyces from Resinogalea. In the former, they are broadly ellipsoidal with distinct surface ornamentations, while in the latter they are smooth with a biconcave disc structure similar to that of red blood cells.

== Habitat and distribution ==
Bruceomyces castoris was isolated from the sap and chewed wood of beaver teeth scars at the base of living grand fir trees in Oregon, United States. Resinogalea humboldtensis was found growing on the partly hardened resin of Araucaria humboldtensis in New Caledonia. Both fungi are found in temperate environments that are constantly humid.
