= Resinogalea =

Scientific classification
- Domain: Eukaryota
- Kingdom: Fungi
- Division: Ascomycota
- Class: Eurotiomycetes
- Subclass: Cryptocaliciomycetidae
- Order: Cryptocaliciales
- Family: Cryptocaliciaceae
- Genus: Resinogalea; Rikkinen & A.R.Schmidt (2016)

Type species
- Resinogalea humboldtensis Rikkinen & A.R.Schmidt (2016)

Species
- R. humboldtensis R. araucana R. tapulicola

Genus of resinicolous fungi in the Cryptocaliciaceae

Resinogalea is a genus of fungi belonging to the family Cryptocaliciaceae in the subclass Cryptocaliciomycetidae of the class Eurotiomycetes. Originally described as a single-species genus in 2016, the genus now includes three known species.

== Taxonomy and phylogeny ==
The genus was initially established by Jouko Rikkinen and Alexander Schmidt in 2016 to accommodate Resinogalea humboldtensis, a fungus found on resin produced by the endemic tree Araucaria humboldtensis in New Caledonia. Initially, due to limited DNA data, the genus was placed in the unresolved family Bruceomycetaceae.

In 2023, further research involving DNA analysis and morphological examination led to the description of two additional species, R. araucana and R. tapulicola. These species were isolated from resin on the branches of the tree Araucaria araucana (the monkey puzzle tree) in Chile. DNA-based phylogenetic studies confirmed that Resinogalea belongs to the recently described subclass Cryptocaliciomycetidae, family Cryptocaliciaceae. Consequently, the genus was reclassified into this family, aligning it closely with the genus Cryptocalicium.

== Species ==
Resinogalea humboldtensis is known only from dried resin exuded by damaged Araucaria humboldtensis trees. It is characterized by distinctive ascomata (fruiting bodies) covered by resin and stipes coated with mineral deposits. Attempts to culture or extract DNA from this species have thus far been unsuccessful.

Resinogalea araucana forms conspicuous, reddish-brown fruiting bodies on resin patches caused by damage from insects or pathogenic fungi on branches of the monkey puzzle tree. Its spores are small, broadly elliptical, and smooth. In culture, it produces colonies with a slimy appearance and sporodochia (aggregates of spores) as mucilaginous masses. It differs from the type species primarily in having larger, urn-shaped fruiting bodies and slightly larger spores.

Resinogalea tapulicola has only been observed as cultures isolated from resin-covered bark of the monkey puzzle tree. Unlike R. araucana, it grows faster, produces drier colonies, and releases a distinctive reddish pigment. Morphologically, it has richly branched conidiophores and sporodochia arising from filamentous melanized hyphae rather than pseudostromatic tissues.

== Distribution and habitat ==
The genus currently comprises species found exclusively on resin produced by species of Araucaria, reflecting a highly specialized resinicolous (resin-dwelling) lifestyle. R. humboldtensis is restricted to New Caledonia, while R. araucana and R. tapulicola are found in southern Chile associated with Araucaria araucana.
