= Monascaceae =

Scientific classification
- Kingdom: Fungi
- Division: Ascomycota
- Class: Eurotiomycetes
- Subclass: Eurotiomycetidae
- Family: Monascaceae; J. Schröter 1894

Genera
- See text

Family of fungi

Monascaceae is a former family of fungi in the subclass Eurotiomycetidae.

== Genera ==
According to Mycobank, Monascaceae was subdivided as follows:

- Allescheria
- Backusia
- Basipetospora
- Eurotiella
- Fraseriella
- Monascus
- Physomyces
- Xeromyces

The primary genus Monascus is currently ranked in Aspergillaceae with most other genera now being synonyms to Monascus.
