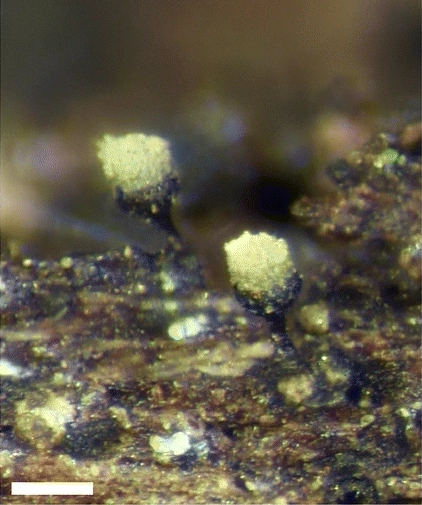
- Cryptocalicium ascomata with mazaedia

Scientific classification
- Kingdom: Fungi
- Division: Ascomycota
- Class: Eurotiomycetes
- Subclass: Cryptocaliciomycetidae; M.Prieto, Etayo & Olariaga (2021)
- Order: Cryptocaliciales; M.Prieto, Etayo & Olariaga (2021)
- Family: Cryptocaliciaceae; Etayo, Olariaga & M.Prieto (2021)
- Genus: Cryptocalicium; Etayo, Olariaga & M.Prieto (2021)
- Species: C. blascoi

Binomial name
- Cryptocalicium blascoi Etayo, Olariaga & M.Prieto (2021)

= Cryptocalicium =

Species of ascomycete fungus

Cryptocalicium is a single-species fungal genus of the order Eurotiomycetes that was circumscribed in 2021. It contains the species Cryptocalicium blascoi. Cryptocalicium is the only genus in the monotypic family Cryptocaliciaceae, the order Cryptocaliciales and the subclass Cryptocaliciomycetidae.

Cryptocalicium is a representative of the "mazaediate" or "calicioid" fungi, a polyphyletic group of independently evolved ascomycetes that share a morphological characteristic: the presence of a distinct structure in which loose masses of ascospores accumulate to be passively disseminated, called the mazaedium.

== Morphology ==
Members of Cryptocalicium have very small stalked apothecioid ascomata that produce a mazaedium. The hymenium of the ascomata presents septate, sterile (i.e. not fertile) protruding elements. Their asci are clavate in shape with a long stalk, they are bitunicate with evanescent walls, and turn amyloid after a chemical treatment with KOH and IKI. The ascospores are globose to subglobose, simple, pale brown in color, with thick walls, and are passively released thanks to the mazaedium. The stalk has a cortex, with the outermost layer composed of 1 or 2 rows of cylindrical aseptate hyphae, dark reddish brown in color and tightly adhered. The stalk medulla (below the cortex) is composed of cylindrical hyaline hyphae. The pigment granules on the external surface of ascomata appear dark violet in water, but after partly dissolving in KOH they turn turquoise green.

In particular, the species C. blascoi is defined as a lichen measuring 0.15–0.36 mm in height without mazaedium, with a peridium spherical or urniform in shape measuring 0.05–0.10 × 0.10–0.15 mm that appears dark violet when wet but black and shiny when dehydrated, with an ocre disk around the peridium, and a stalk measuring 0.10–0.26 × 0.02–0.04 mm that is smooth, black and shiny, sometimes with a broader base.

== Ecology and distribution ==
C. blascoi is a saprobic lichen, either solitary or gregarious, found on the inner side of loose but still attached bark strips. It has been observed in several Cupressaceae species of trees, such as Juniperus oxycedrus, J. thurifera and Cupressus sempervirens.
It is found in multiple Spanish provinces: Ávila, Burgos, Madrid, Soria, Toledo and Zaragoza.

== Taxonomy ==
Cryptocalicium blascoi, along with its genus, family, order and subclass, were described in 2021 by María Prieto, Javier Etayo and Ibai Olariaga. The holotype was found in La Cabilda Park, in Hoyo de Manzanares, Madrid (Spain).

The generic name "Cryptocalicium" refers to the calicioid (=mazaediate) ascomata that occur hidden under the bark, while the specific epithet "blascoi" is a reference to Javier Blasco Zumeta, an important Aragonese naturalist who showed the authors the first locality where this species was found and who provided additional material of it.

== Phylogeny ==
Cryptocaliciomycetidae currently represents the closest clade to the subclass Eurotiomycetidae, as the cladogram shows.

- Eurotiomycetes
  - - - Chaetothyriomycetidae
      - - - Eurotiomycetidae
          - Cryptocaliciomycetidae
        - Coryneliomycetidae
    - Sclerococcomycetidae
  - Mycocaliciomycetidae
