= Pina de Ebro =

Coordinates: 41°29′N 0°32′W

- municipality
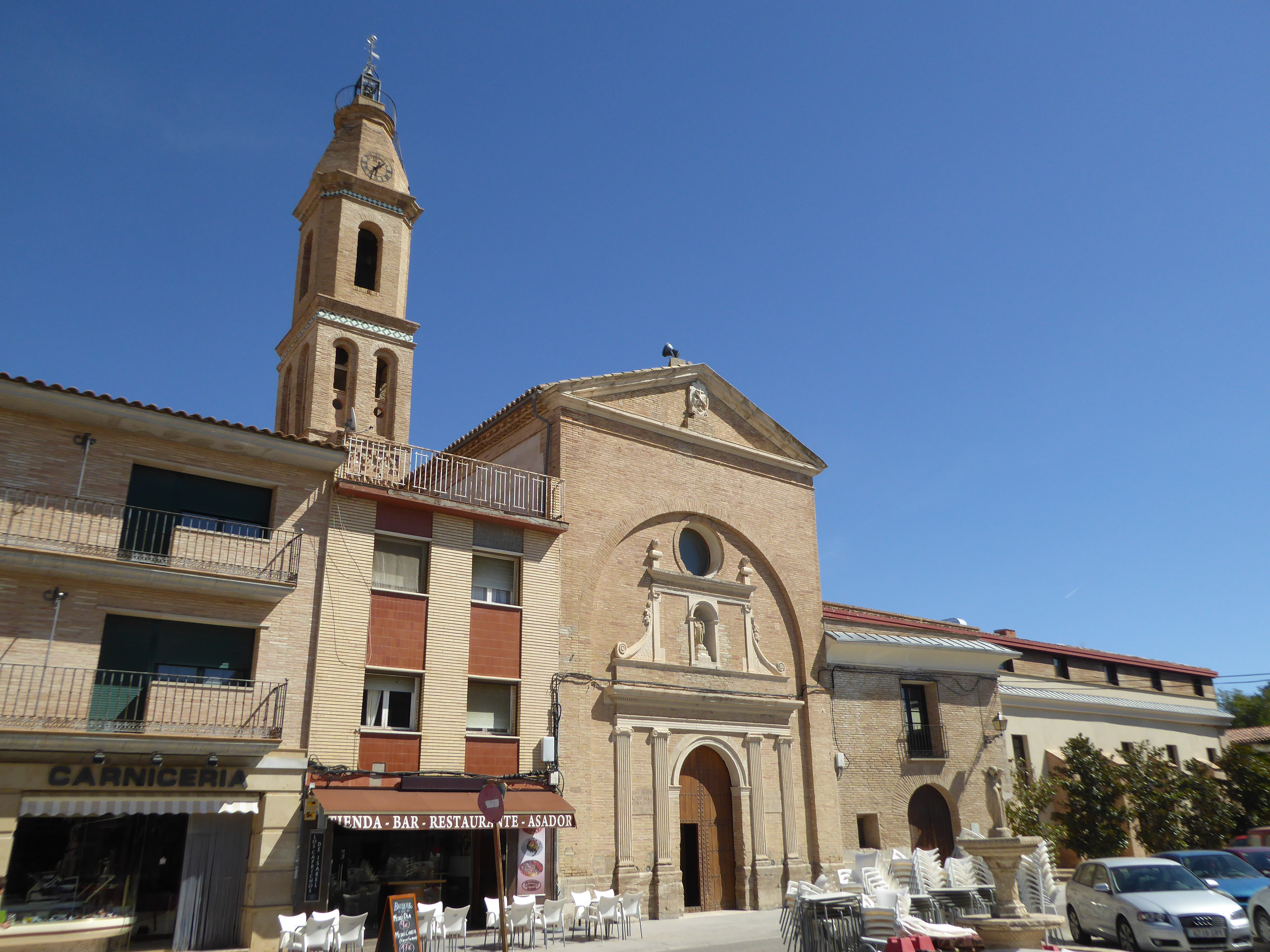
- Church and cloister of the ancient franciscan convent in Pina de Ebro

- Flag Coat of arms
- Interactive map of Pina de Ebro
- Country: Spain
- Autonomous community: Aragon
- Province: Zaragoza

Area
  - Total: 308 km^{2} (119 sq mi)

Population (2025-01-01)
  - Total: 2,478
  - Density: 8.05/km^{2} (20.8/sq mi)
- Time zone: UTC+1 (CET)
  - Summer (DST): UTC+2 (CEST)

Pina de Ebro is a municipality located in the province of Zaragoza, Aragon, Spain. According to the 2004 census (INE), the municipality has a population of 2,352 inhabitants.

== See also ==
- Javier Blasco Zumeta, local teacher and naturalist
- List of municipalities in Zaragoza
