= Javier Blasco Zumeta =

- Born: 1957 (age 68–69); Pina de Ebro, Aragon, Spain
- Known for: Guia Blasco Zumeta de Aves
- Scientific career
- Fields: Nature of Los Monegros, Spain
- Website: http://blascozumeta.com/

Javier Blasco Zumeta is a Spanish primary school teacher and naturalist based in Pina de Ebro, Zaragoza, Aragon, Spain. He has researched the wildlife, plants, birds and insects of Los Monegros in Aragon, Spain, having discovered over 200 species.

== Life ==
As a teenage hunter, he wrote TV naturalist Félix Rodríguez de la Fuente asking for information about taxidermy. Rodríguez instead encouraged him to join ADENA and care for living animals.

== Honors ==
The fungus Cryptocalicium blascoi is named after him, having helped the researchers. Apart from this, a relevant number os insects were also discovered thanks to his works. Some of them are also named after him
