= Brucea macrocarpa =

Conservation status
- Endangered (IUCN 3.1)

Scientific classification
- Kingdom: Plantae
- Clade: Tracheophytes
- Clade: Angiosperms
- Clade: Eudicots
- Clade: Rosids
- Order: Sapindales
- Family: Simaroubaceae
- Genus: Brucea
- Species: B. macrocarpa

Binomial name
- Brucea macrocarpa Stannard

Species of flowering plant

Brucea macrocarpa is a species of plant in the Simaroubaceae family. It is endemic to Kenya, and is being threatened by habitat loss.
