= Xeromyces =

Scientific classification
- Kingdom: Fungi
- Division: Ascomycota
- Class: Eurotiomycetes
- Order: Eurotiales
- Family: Aspergillaceae
- Genus: Xeromyces; L.R. Fraser 1954
- Species: X. bisporus

Binomial name
- Xeromyces bisporus L.R. Fraser 1954

Synonyms
- Monascus bisporus (L.R. Fraser) Arx 1970

Genus of fungi

Xeromyces is a monotypic genus of fungus in the family Monascaceae. Its only species, Xeromyces bisporus, was first described by L.R. Fraser in 1954. No subspecies are listed in the Catalogue of Life.

It is a xerophile, being able to germinate at a water activity levels between 0.62 and 0.97, lower than any other known organism with the exception of Aspergillus penicillioides. However, it requires a higher water activity level to produce spores. It is a spoilage microbe in dry foods with high sugar contents, especially chocolate, honey, molasses, dried fruit or tobacco. Isolation of cultures requires media with 50% glucose.

The estimated genome size of X. bisporus is 24.8 Mb and the fungus lacks the genes normally associated with mycotoxin production.

It has unstalked cleistothecia, and each of its asci has two ascospores. Its simple asexual state consists of one or two round terminal chlamydospores.
