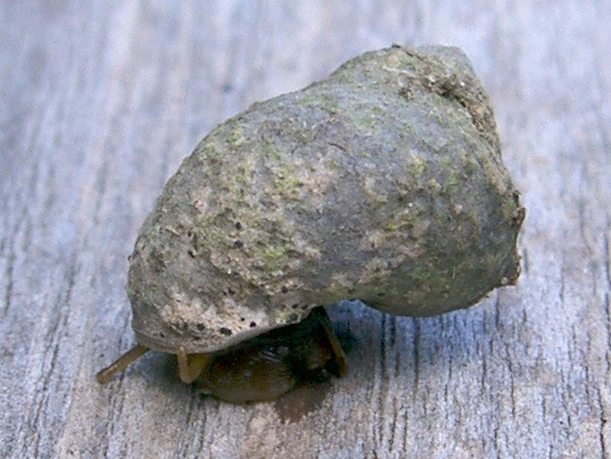
- The lichen Pyrenocollema halodytes on the shell of Littoraria irrorata

Scientific classification
- Domain: Eukaryota
- Kingdom: Fungi
- Division: Ascomycota
- Class: Eurotiomycetes
- Subclass: Chaetothyriomycetidae; Doweld

Orders
- Chaetothyriales; Pyrenulales; Verrucariales

= Chaetothyriomycetidae =

Subclass of fungi

Chaetothyriomycetidae is a subclass of ascomycete within the class Eurotiomycetes. Many species in Chaetothyriomycetidae are lichens.

== Morphology ==
Chaetothyriomycetidae produce a cleistothecium through which they distribute their spores.

== Gallery ==
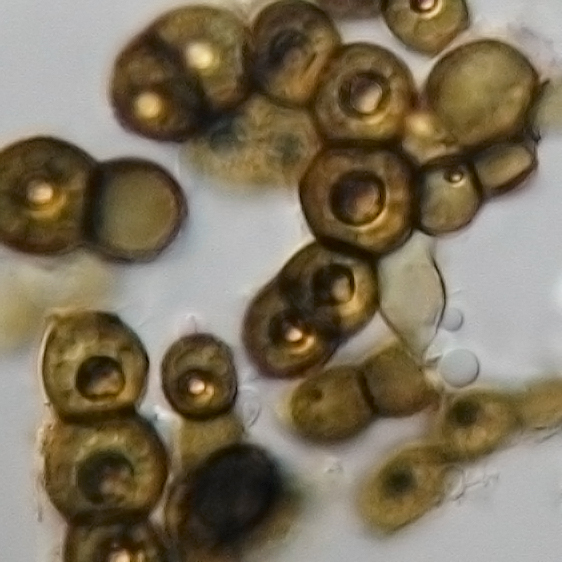

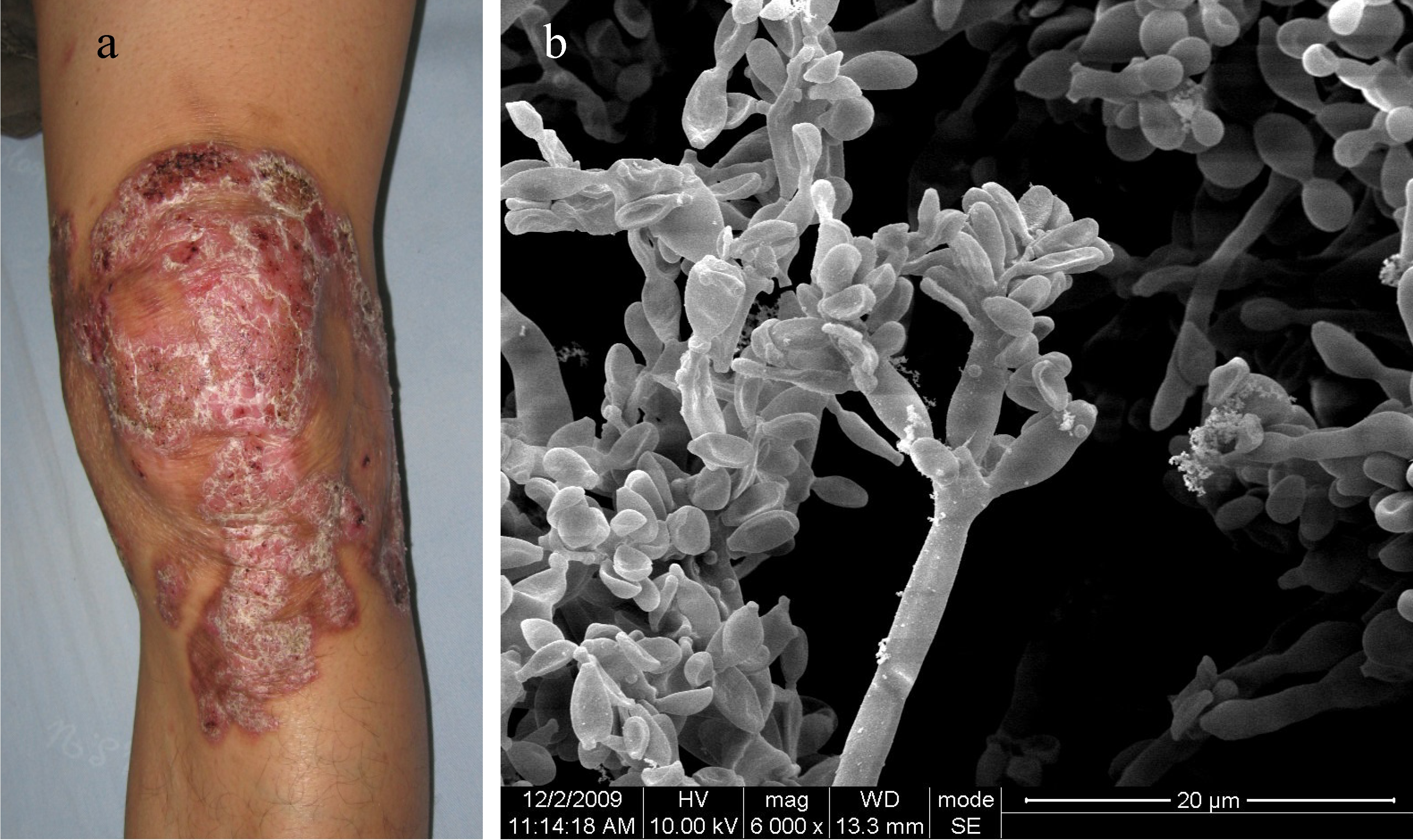

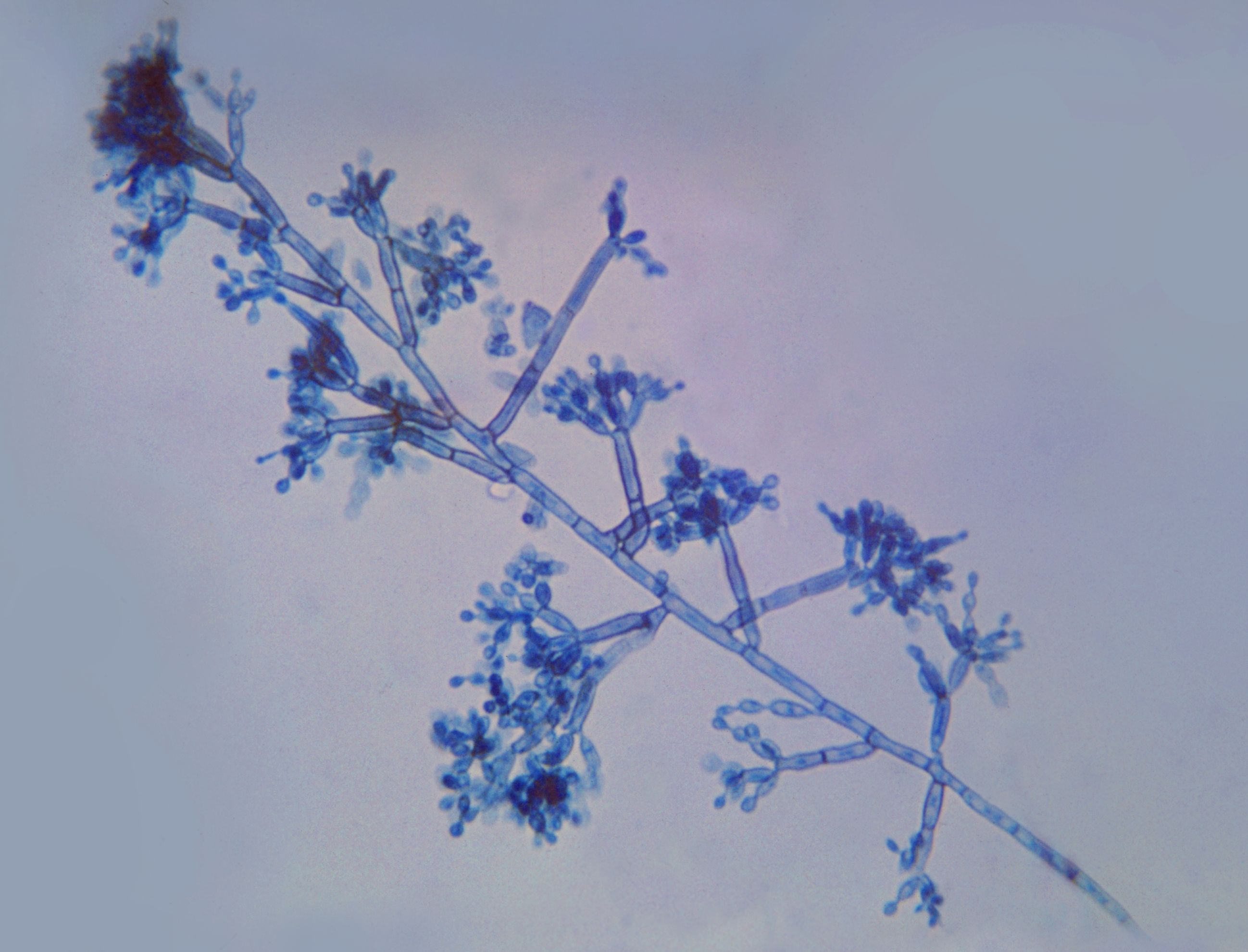

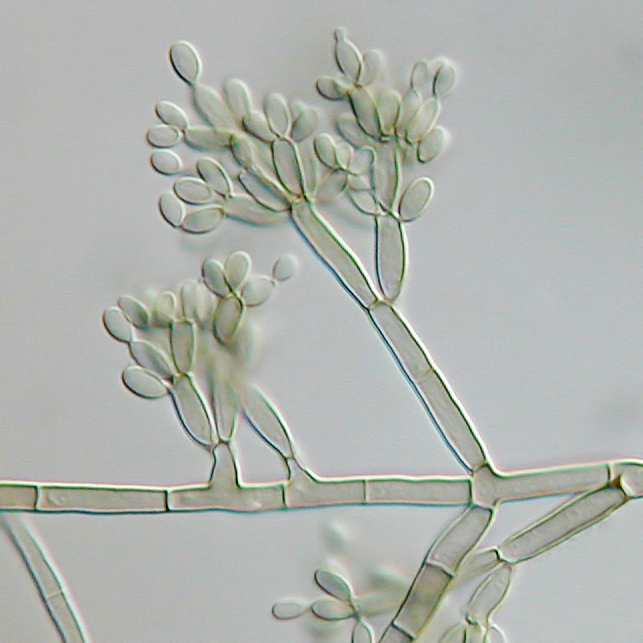

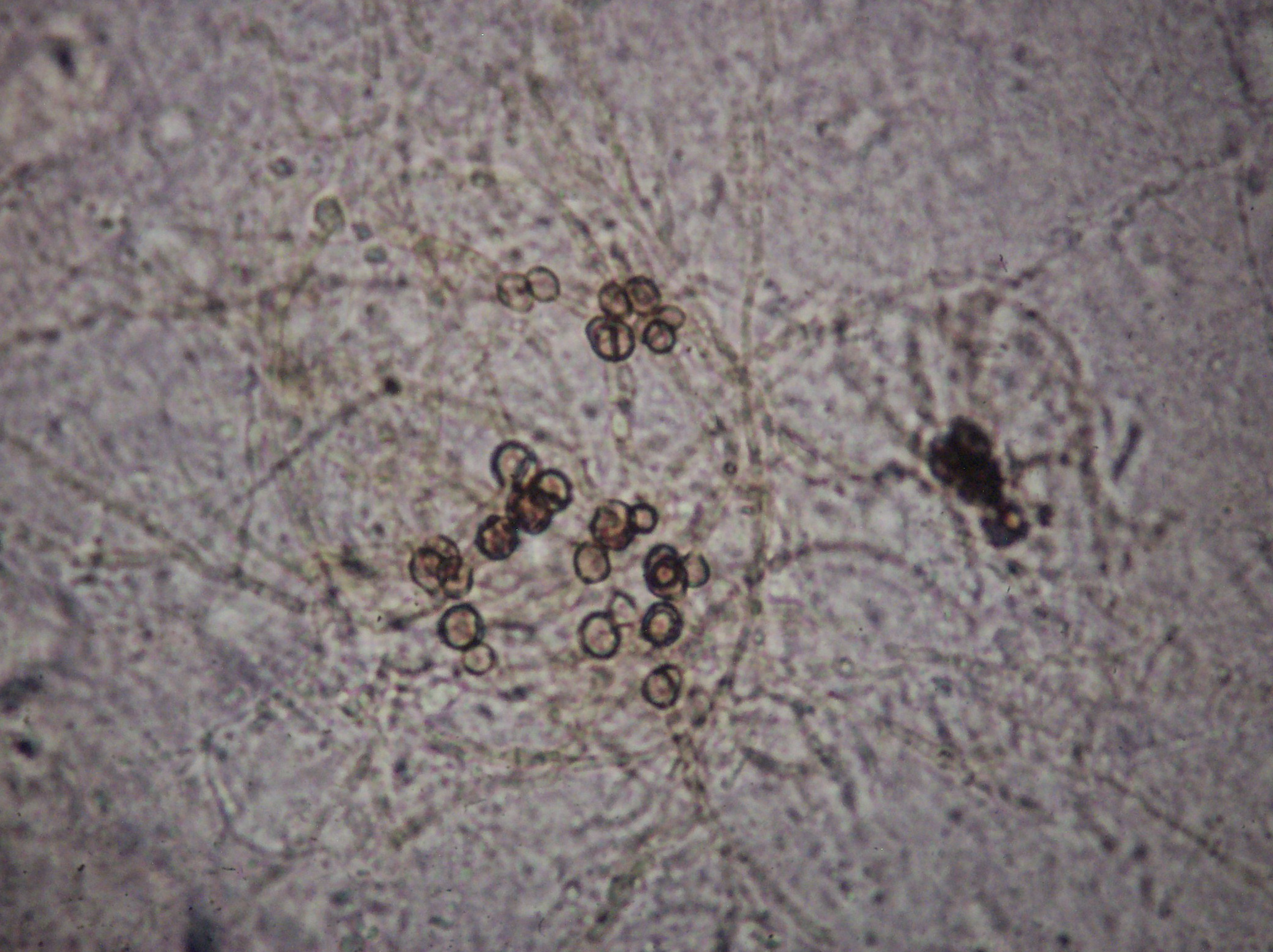

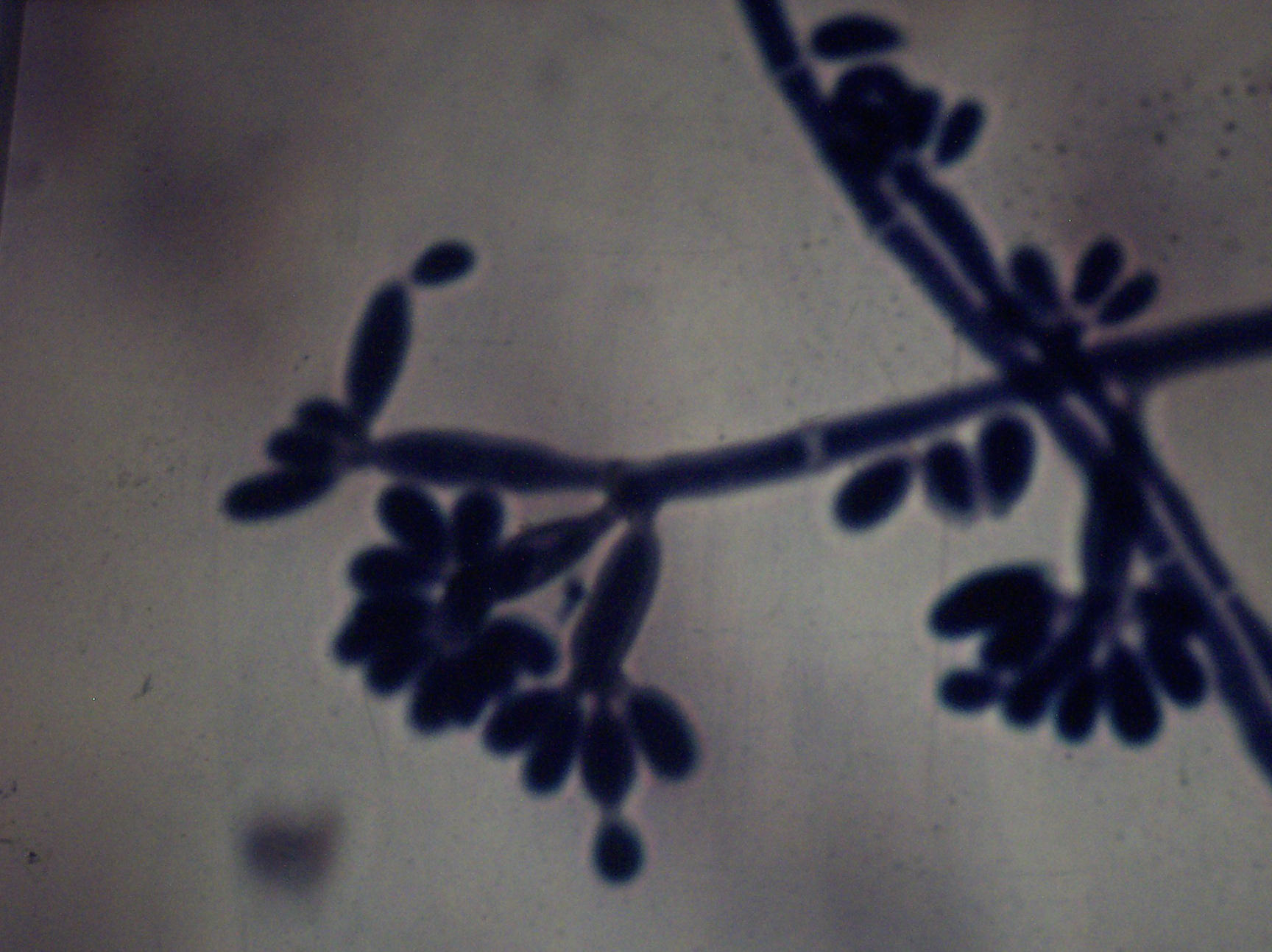

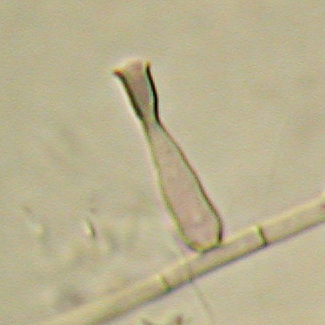

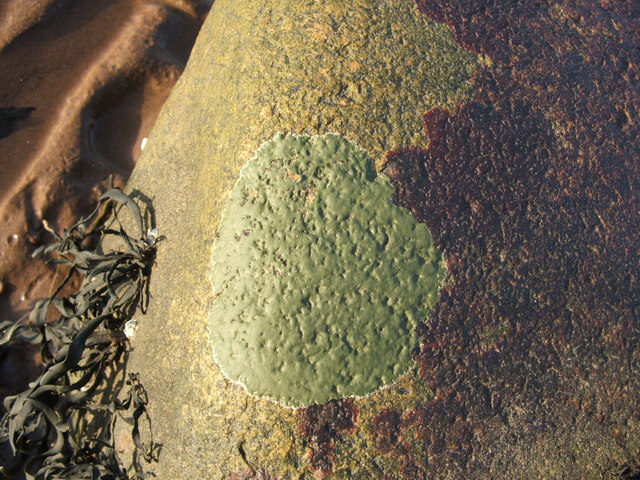

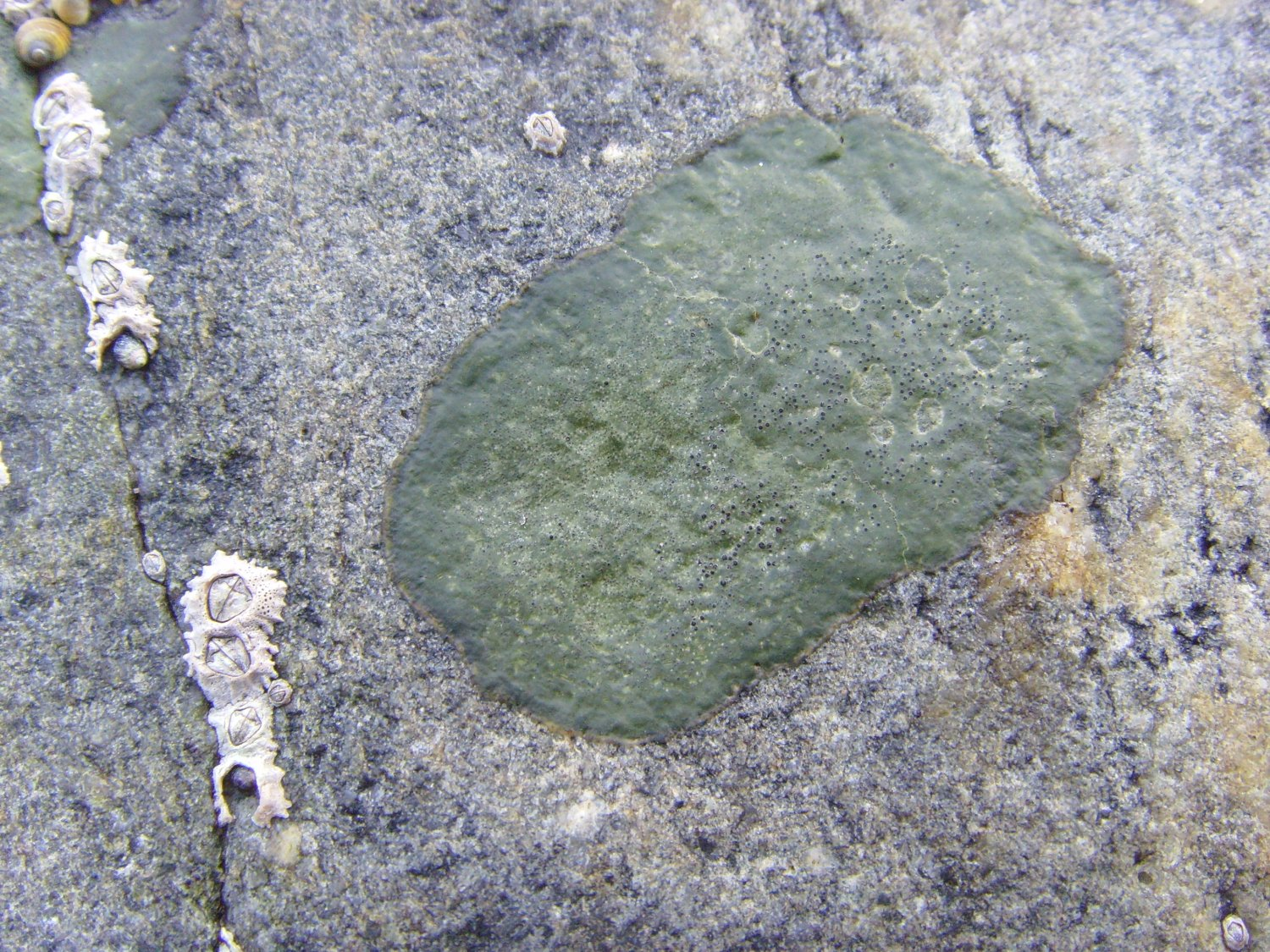

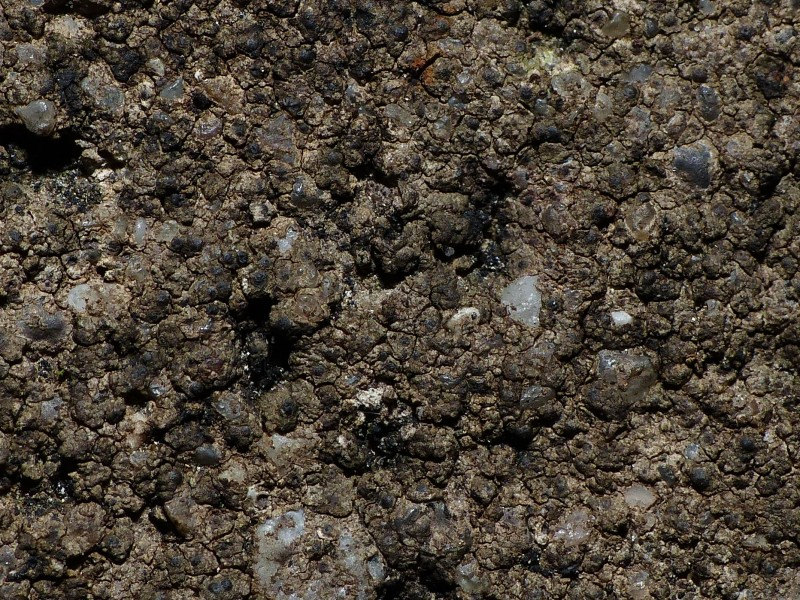

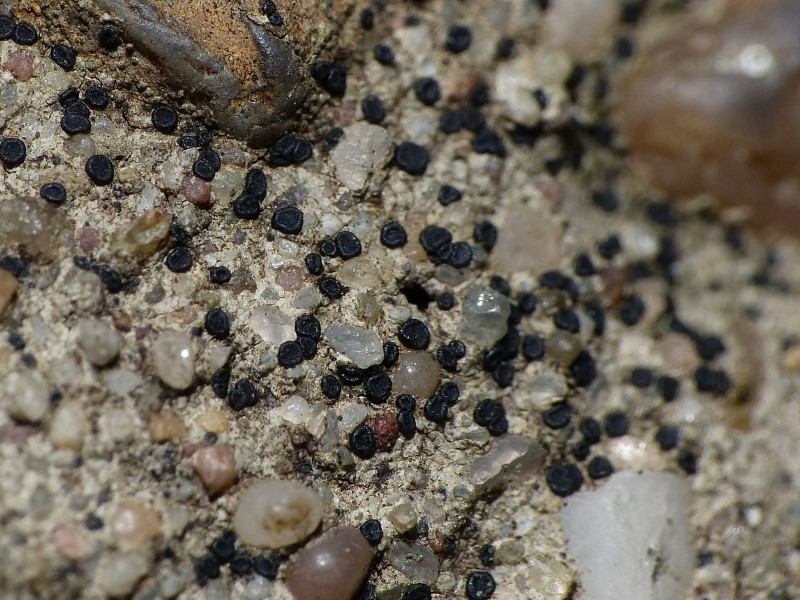

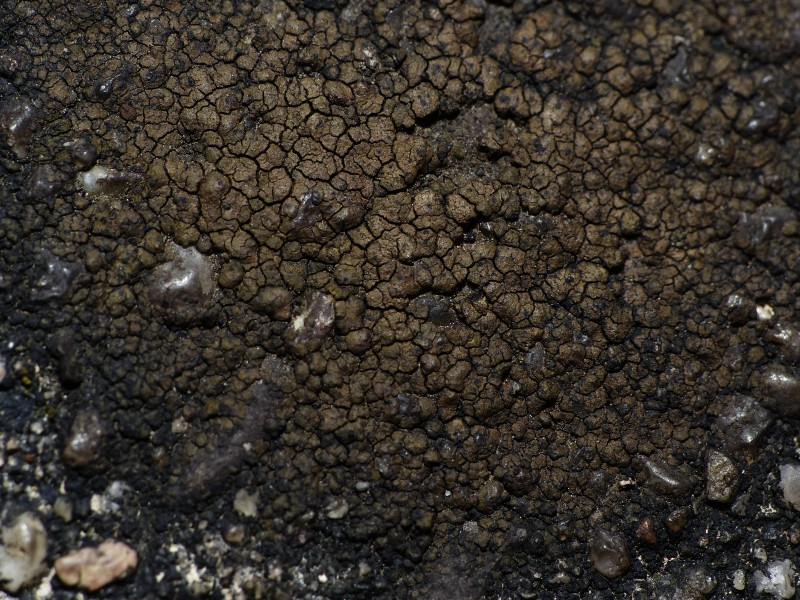

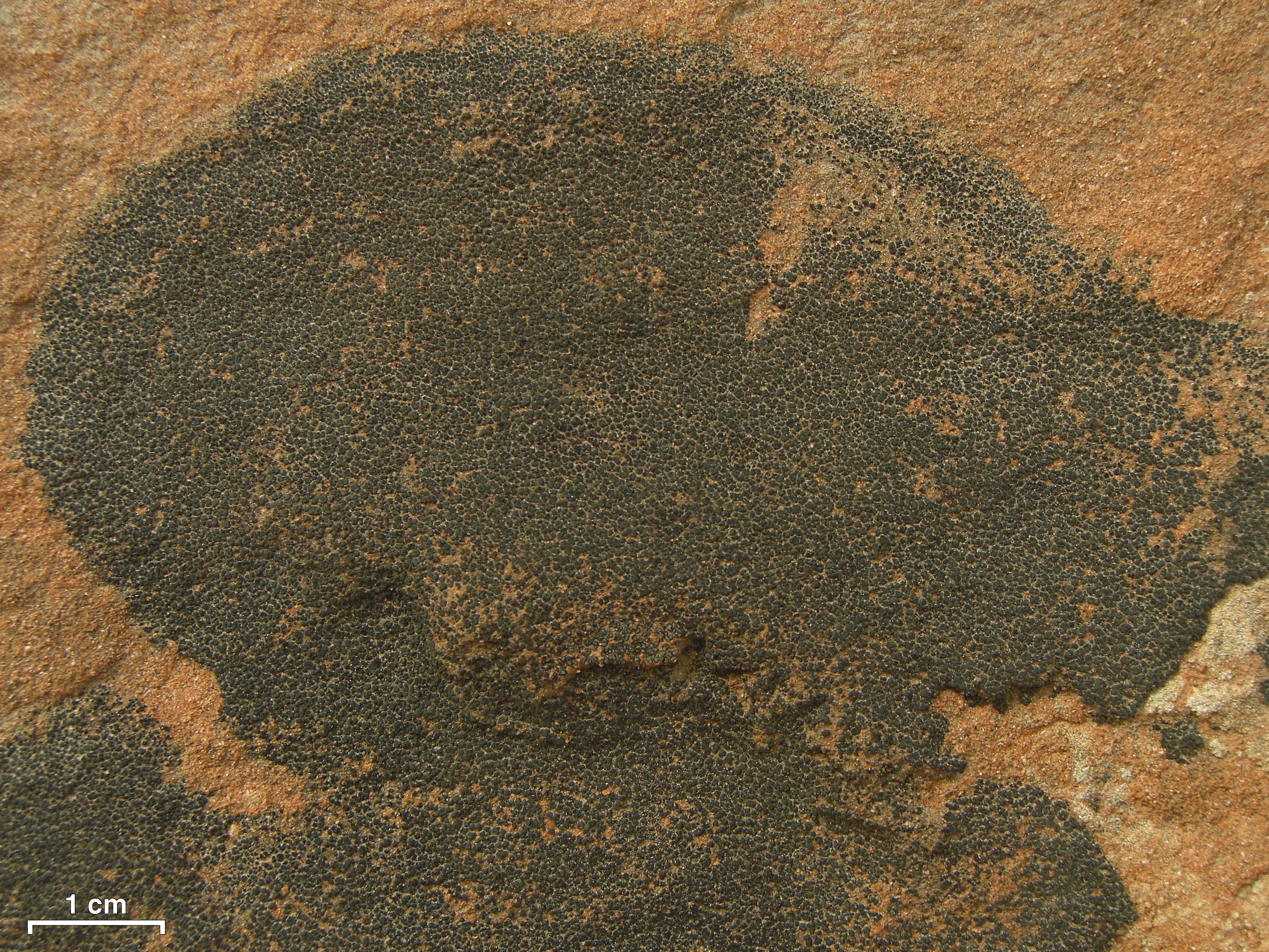

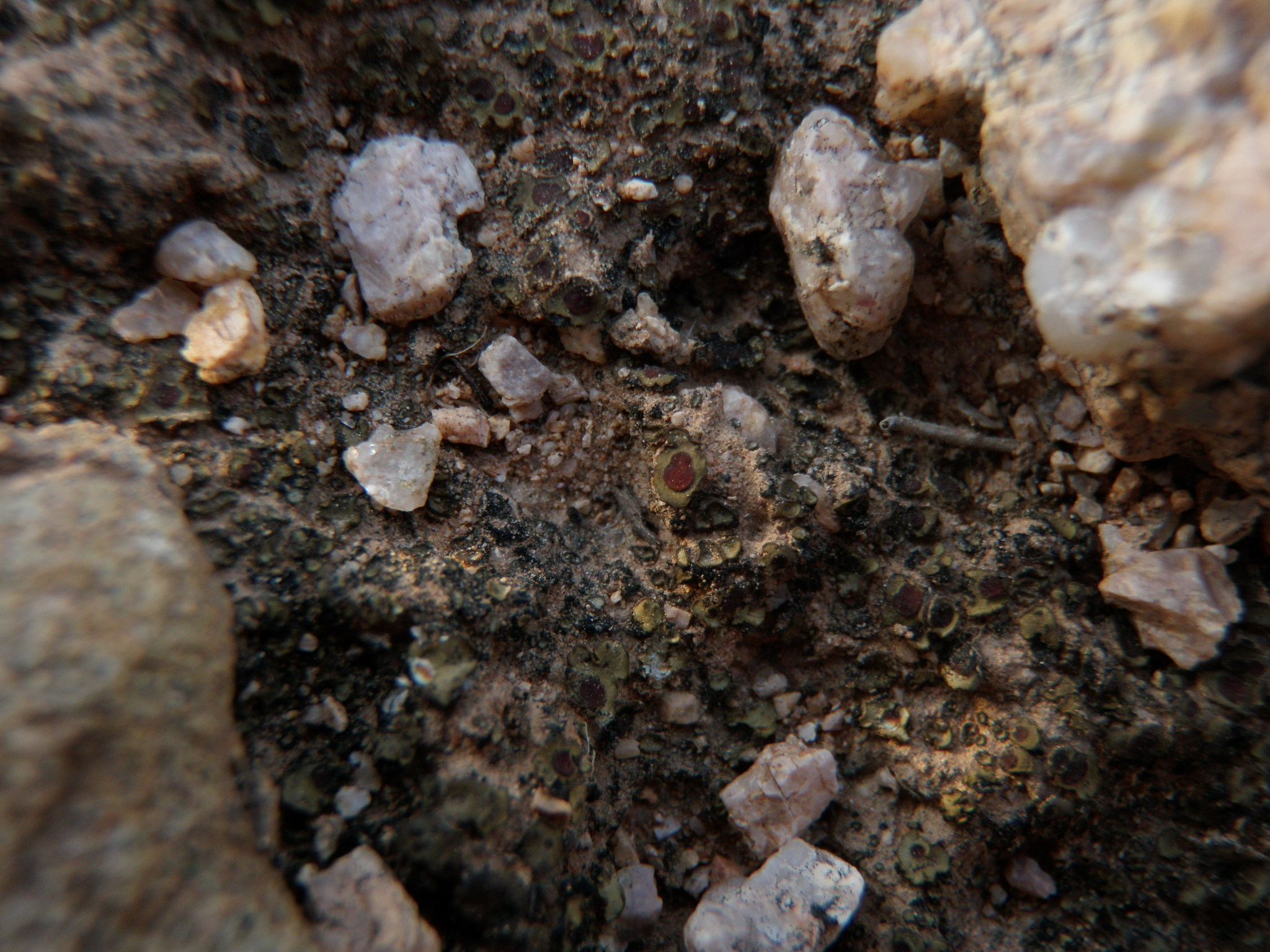

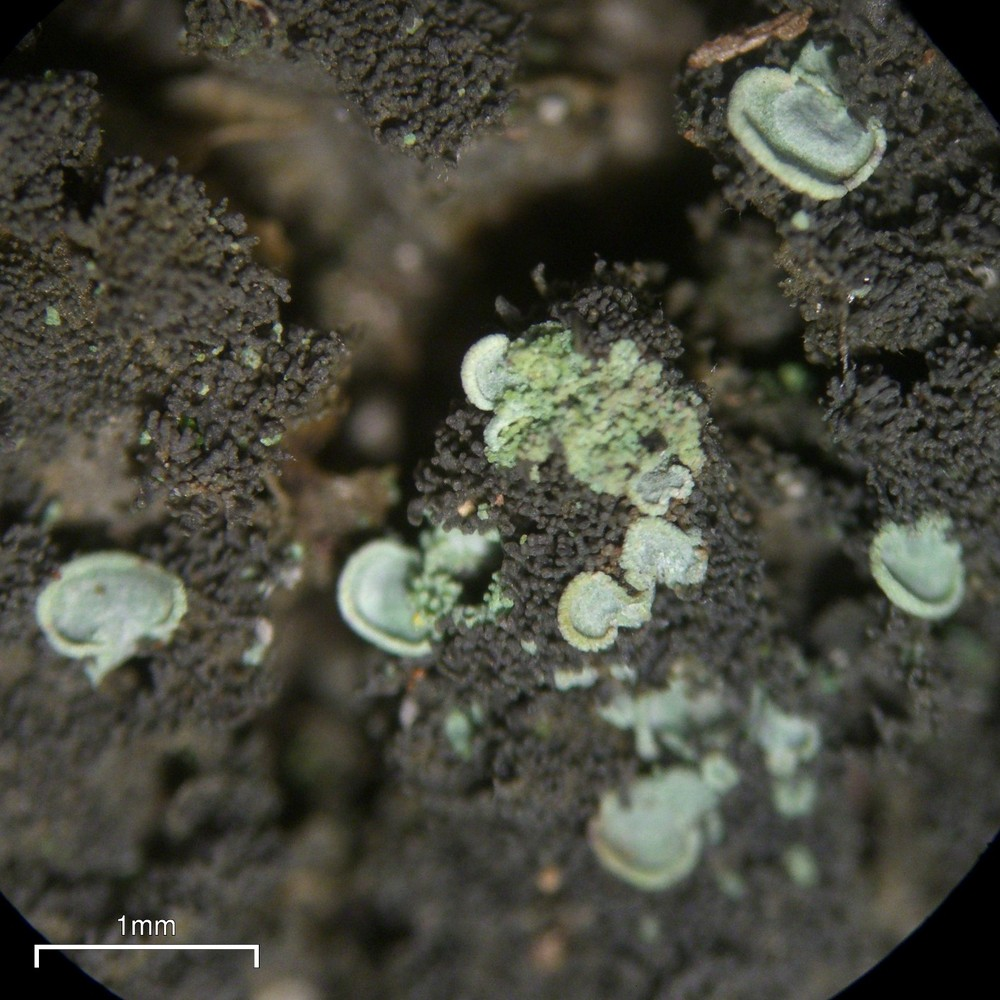

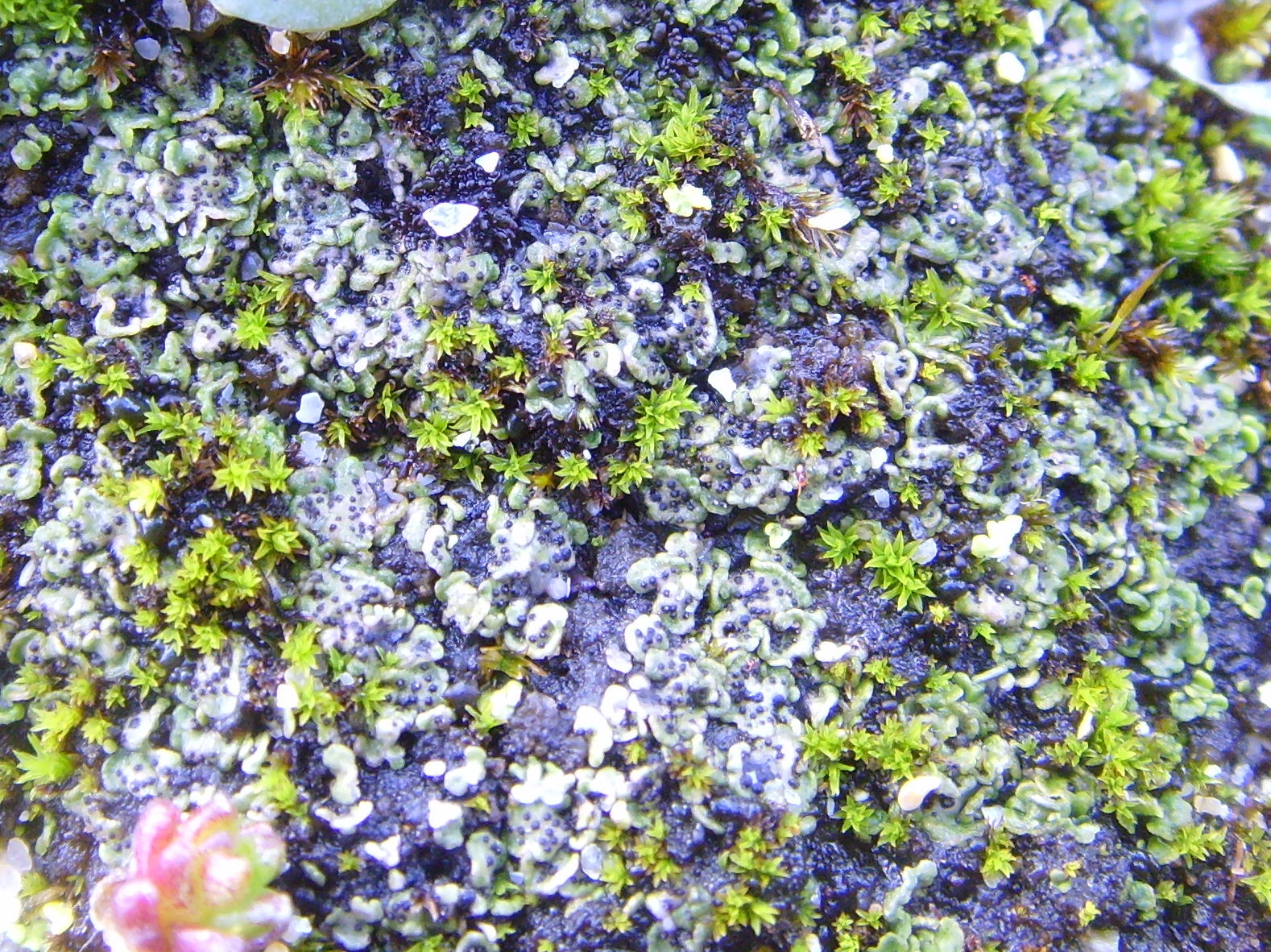

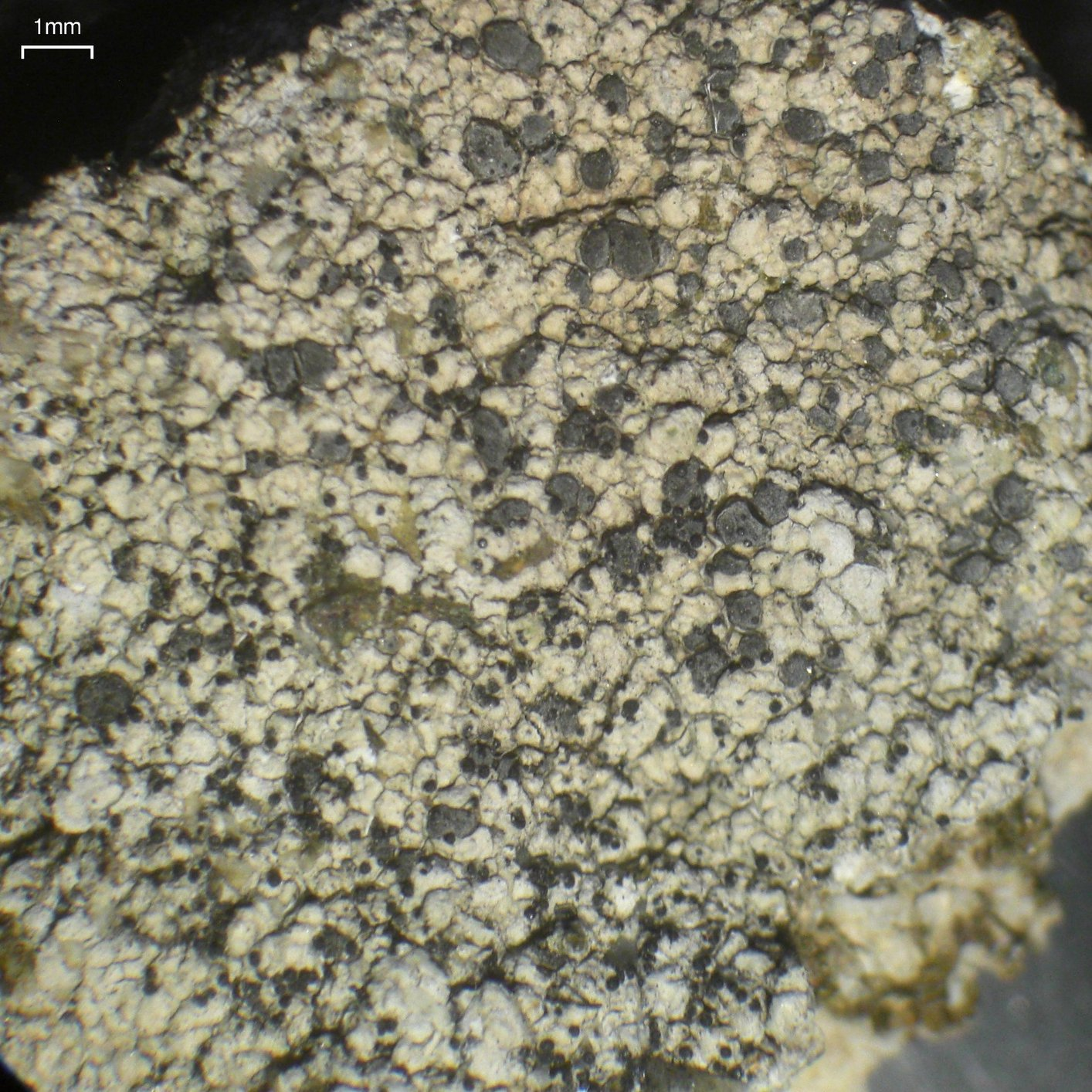

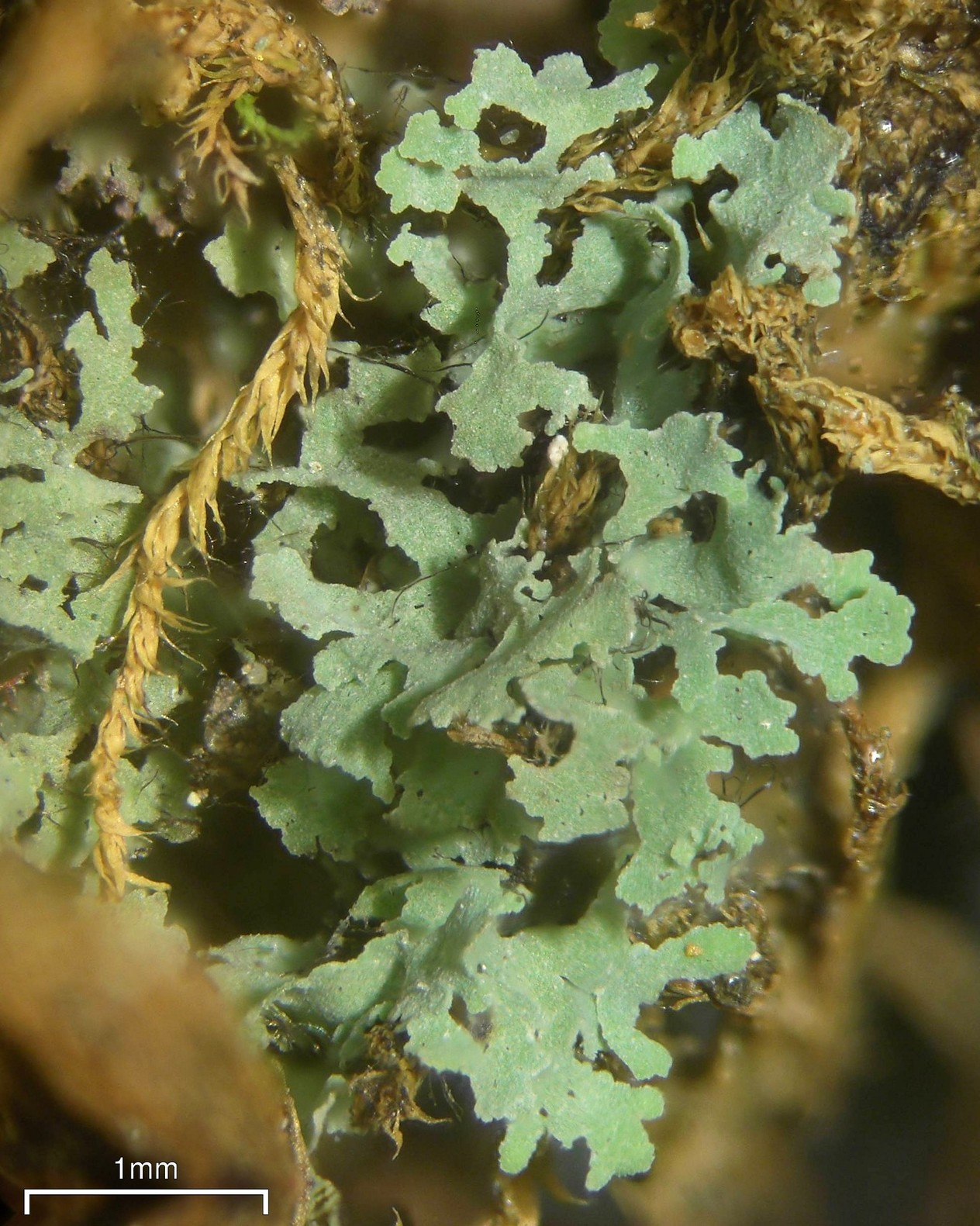

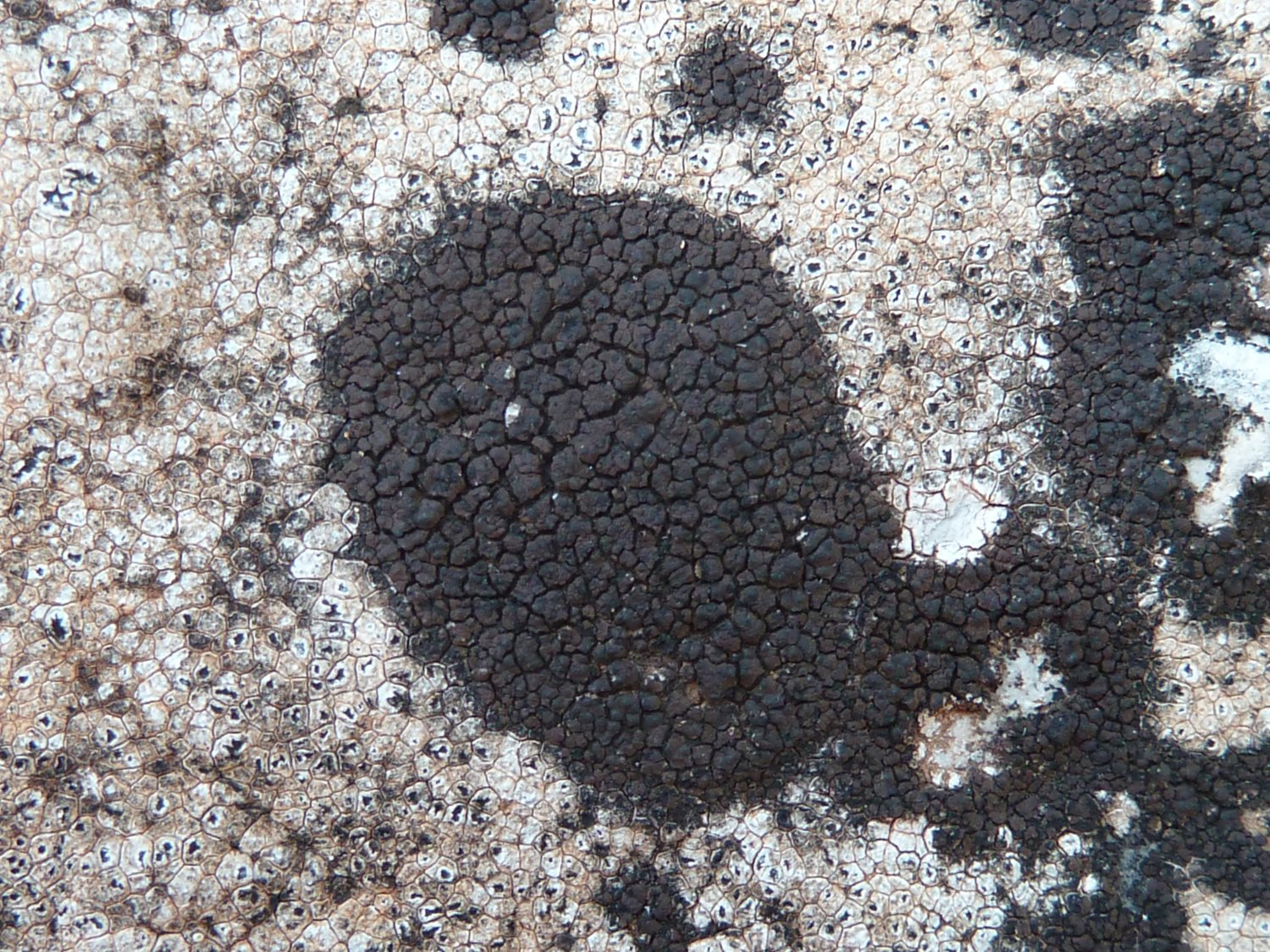

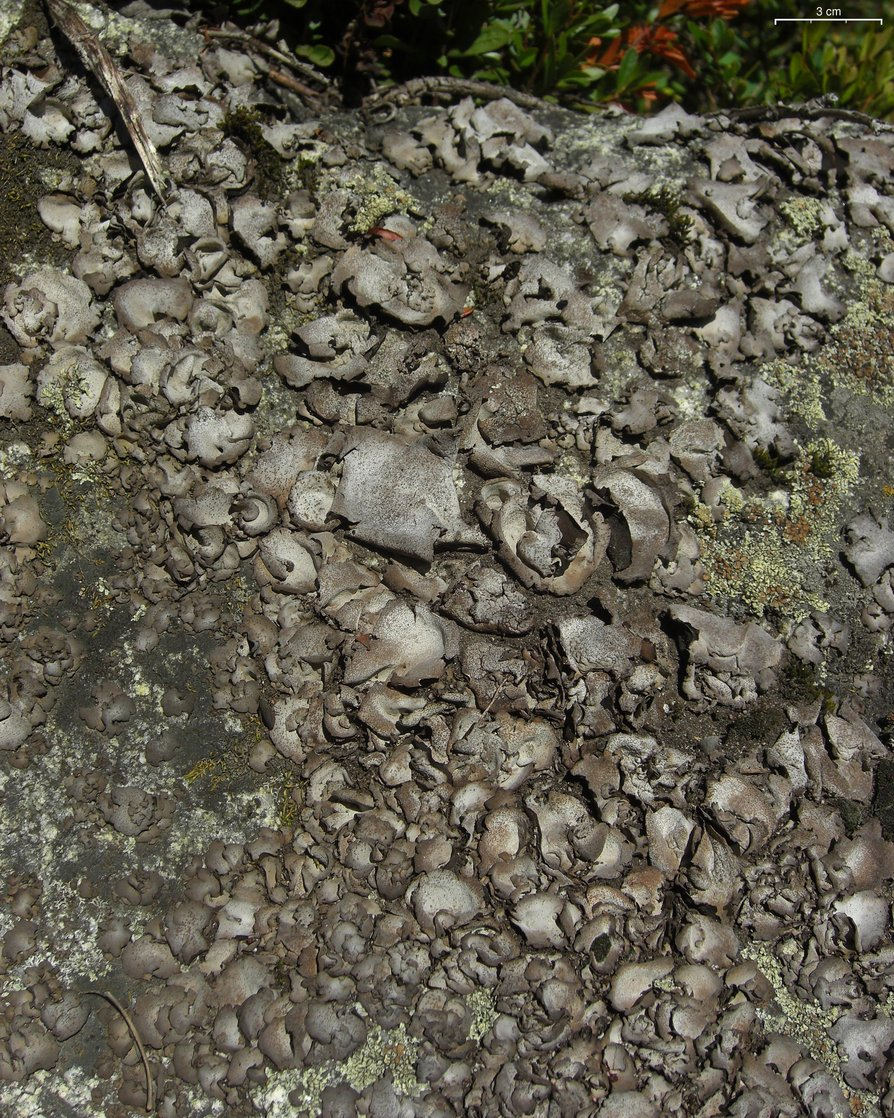

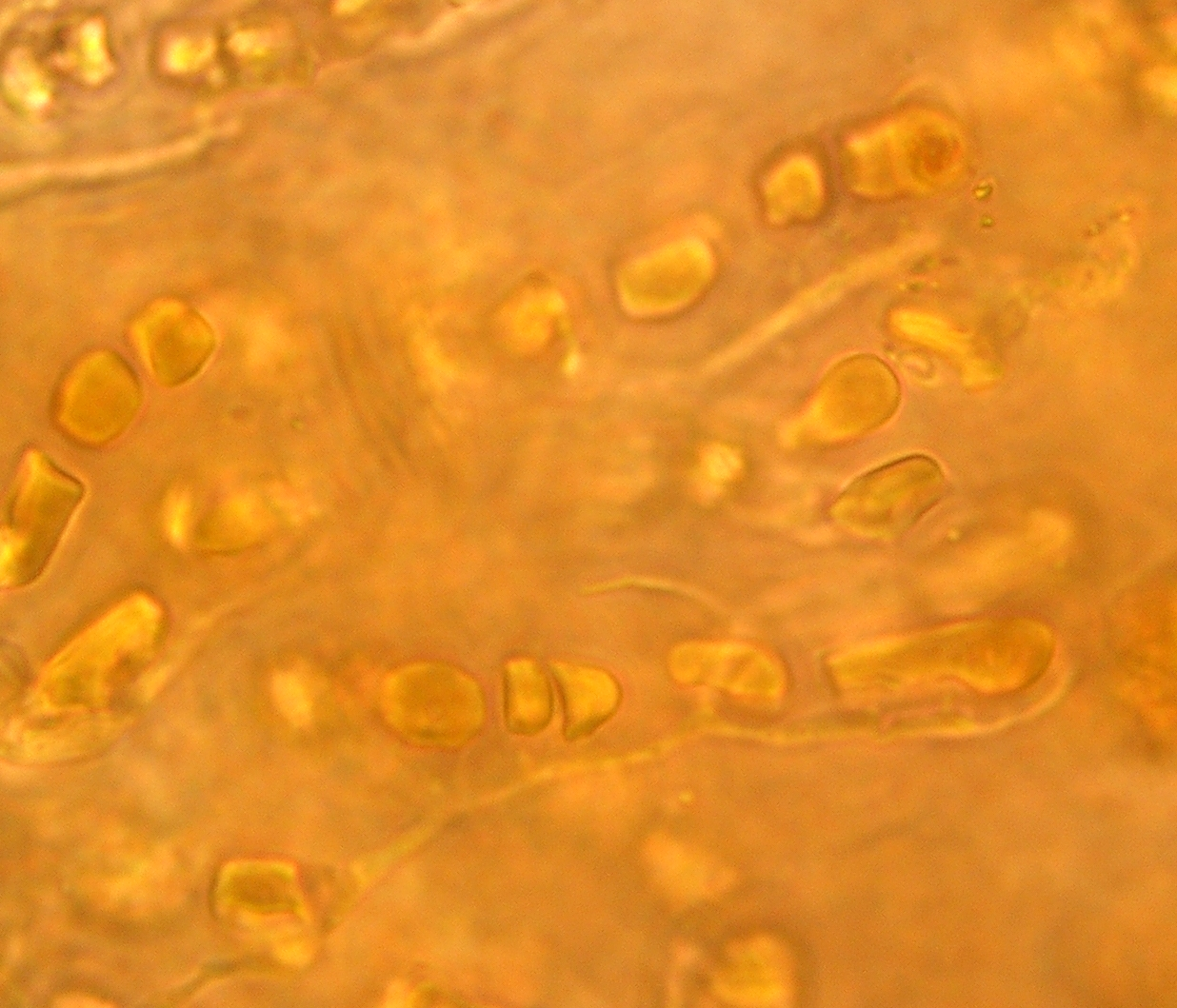

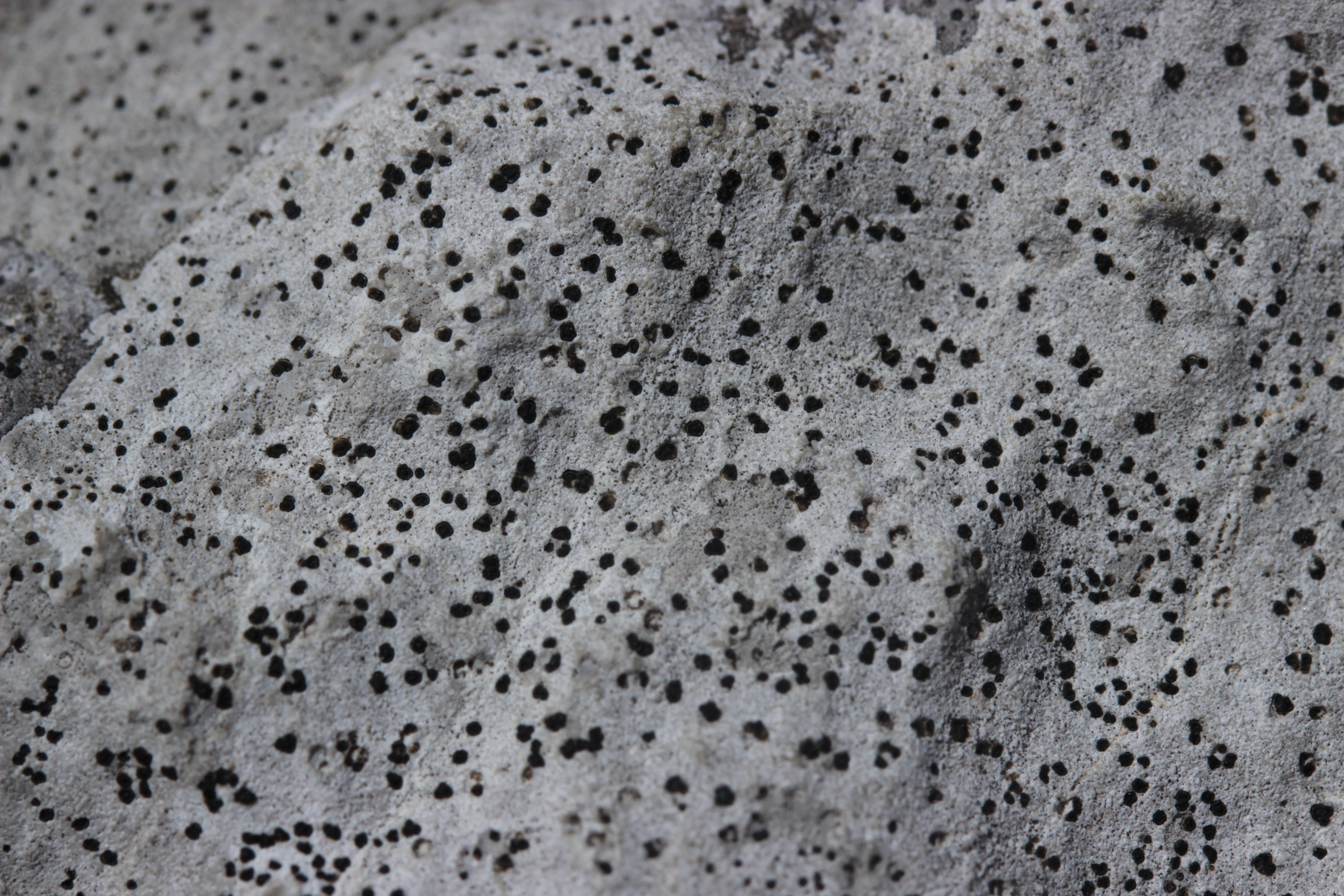

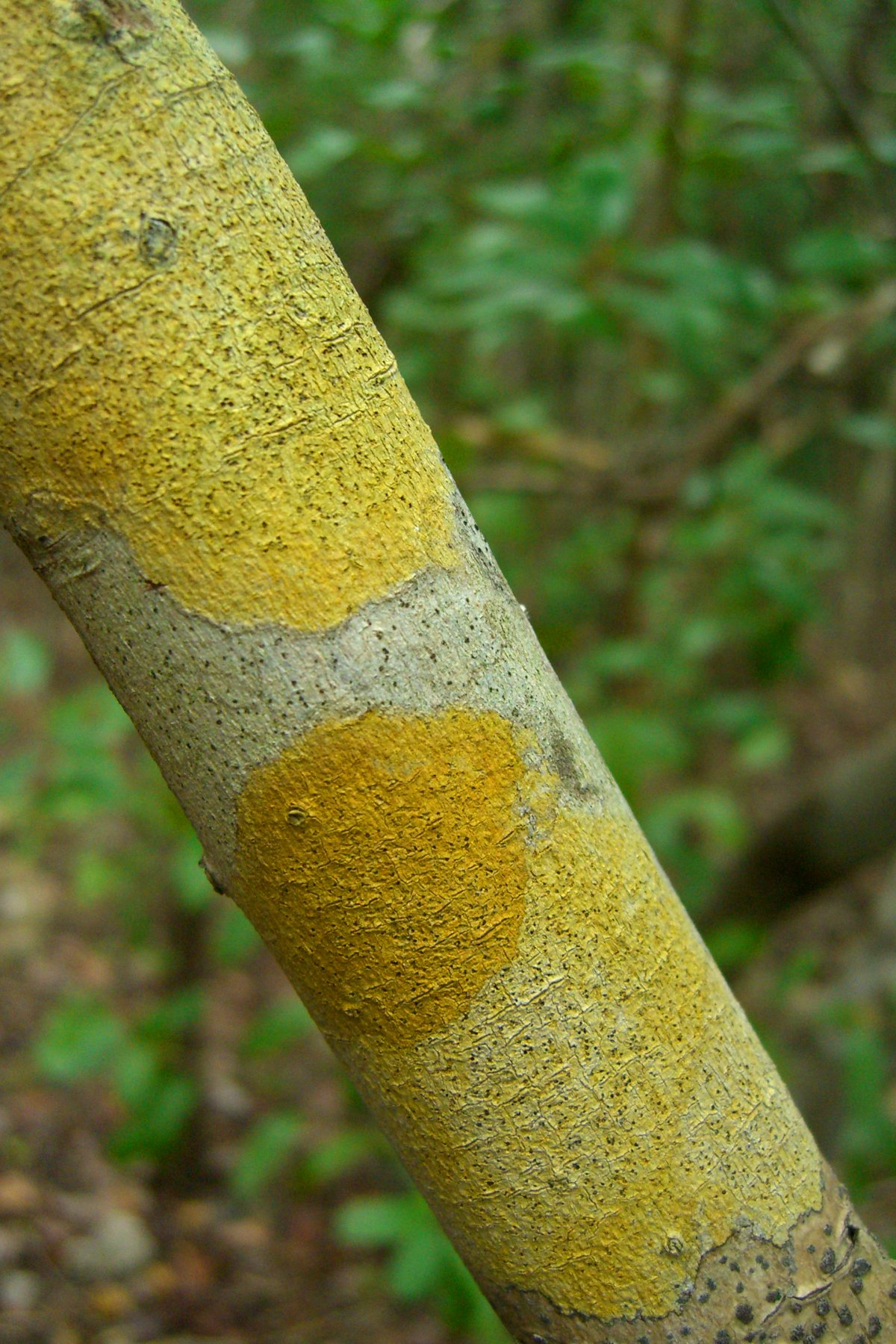

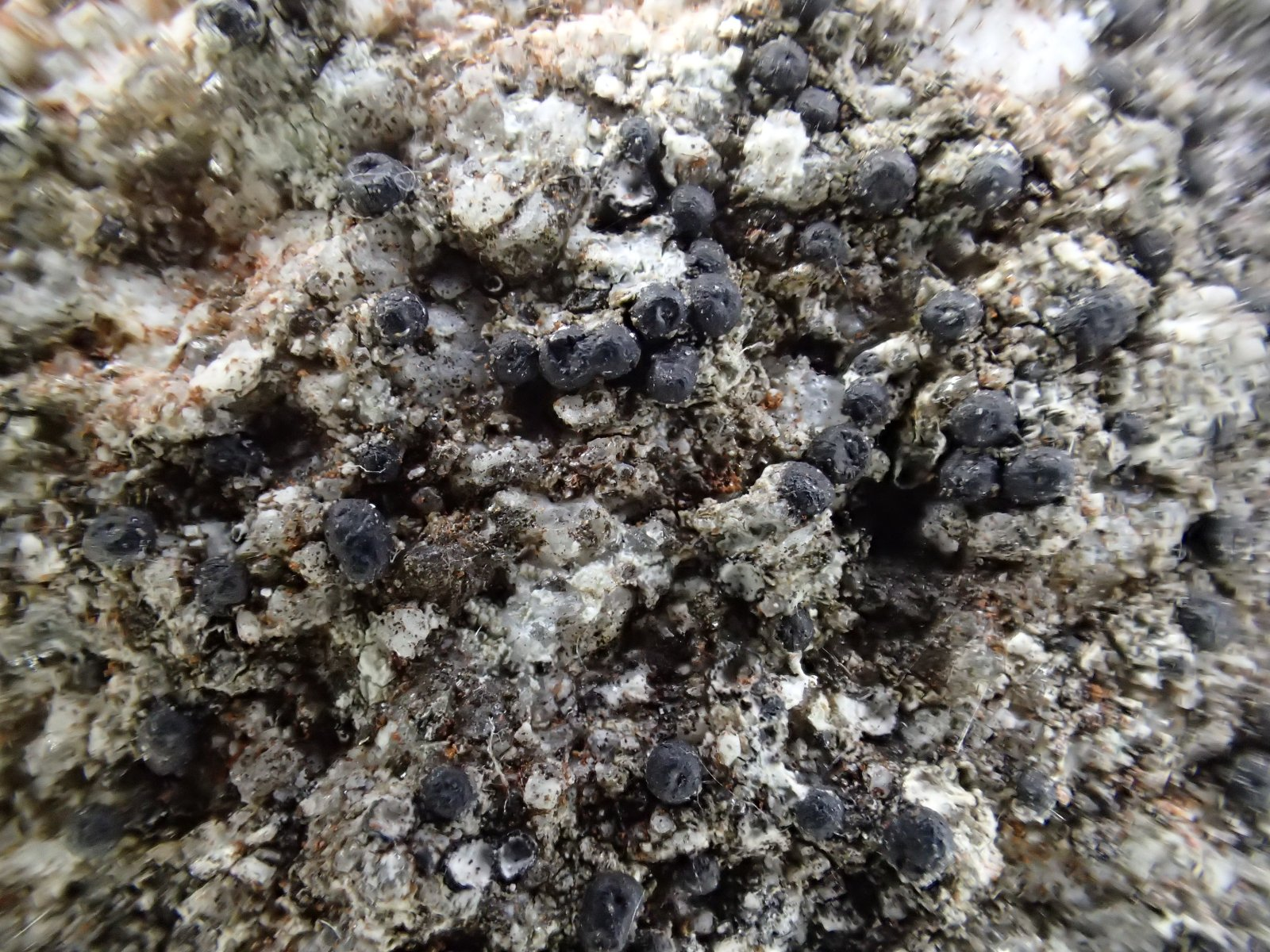

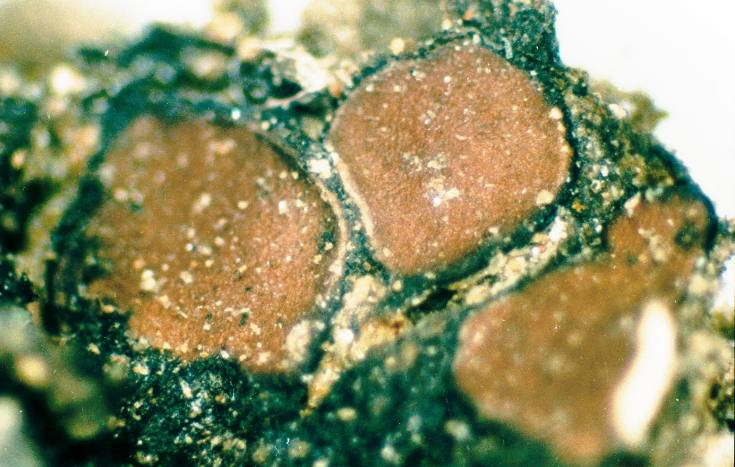
