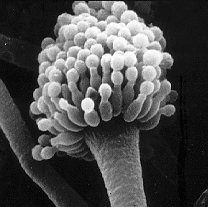
- Electron micrograph picture of Aspergillus fumigatus

Scientific classification
- Kingdom: Fungi
- Division: Ascomycota
- Class: Eurotiomycetes
- Subclass: Eurotiomycetidae; Tehler (1988)

Orders
- See text

= Eurotiomycetidae =

Subclass of fungi

Eurotiomycetidae is a subclass of the Eurotiomycetes.

== Subdivisions ==
According to Mycobank, Eurotiomycetidae is currently subdivided as follows:

- Orders
  - Arachnomycetales
  - Ascosphaerales
  - Coryneliales
  - Elaphomycetales
  - Eurotiales
  - Onygenales
- Families incertae sedis
  - Amorphothecaceae
  - Monascaceae
- Genera incertae sedis
  - Azureothecium
