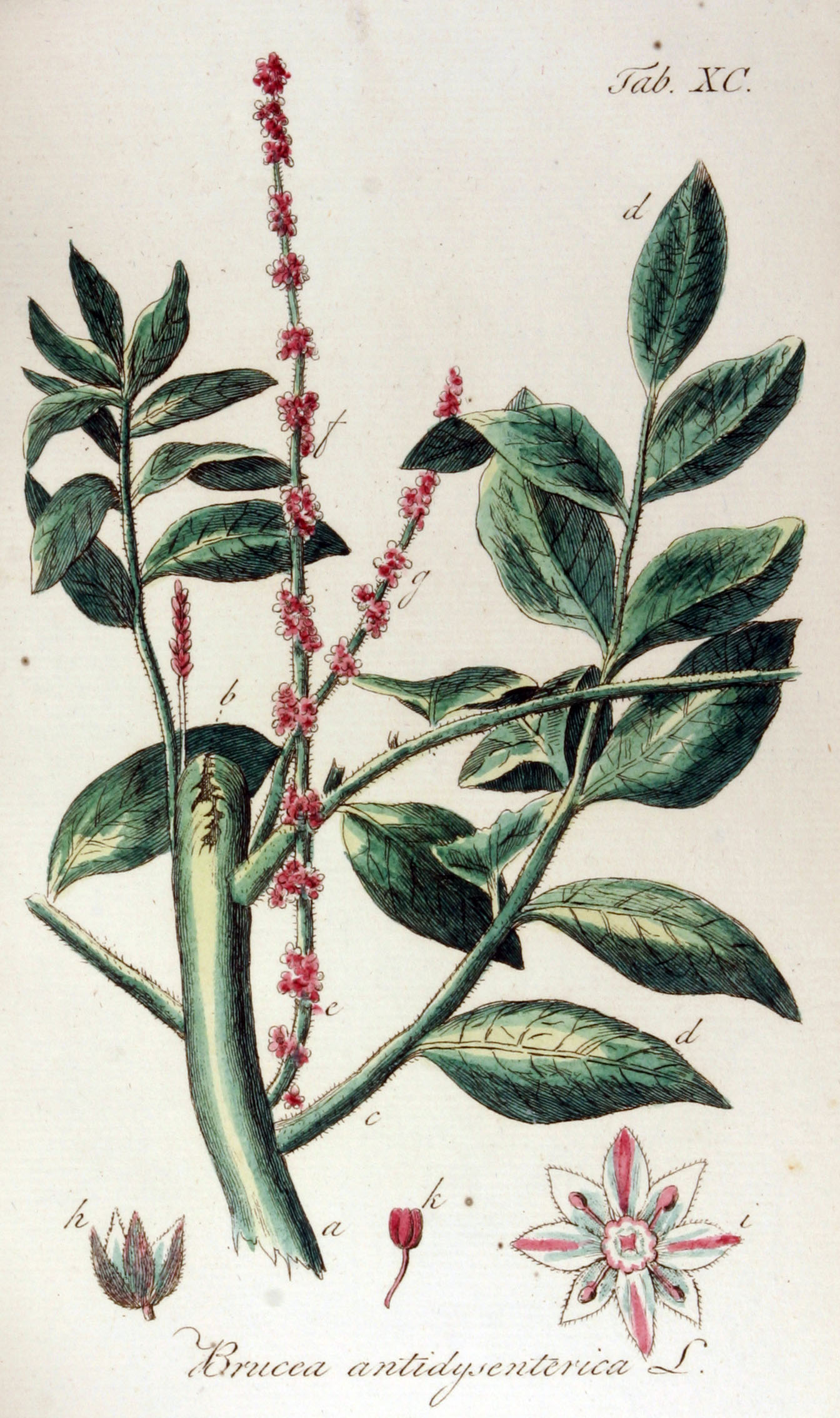
- Brucea antidysenterica

Scientific classification
- Kingdom: Plantae
- Clade: Tracheophytes
- Clade: Angiosperms
- Clade: Eudicots
- Clade: Rosids
- Order: Sapindales
- Family: Simaroubaceae
- Genus: Brucea; J.F.Mill.

Synonyms
- Gonus Lour.; Laumoniera Noot.; Lussa Rumph. ex Kuntze

= Brucea =

Genus of flowering plants

Brucea is a genus of plant in the family Simaroubaceae. It is named for the Scottish scholar and explorer James Bruce.

As of December 2023, Plants of the World Online accepts the following species:

- Brucea antidysenterica J.F.Mill.
- Brucea bruceadelpha (Noot.) Kosterm.
- Brucea guineensis G.Don
- Brucea javanica (L.) Merr.
- Brucea macrocarpa Stannard
- Brucea mollis Wall. ex A.W.Benn.
- Brucea tenuifolia Engl.
- Brucea tonkinensis (Lecomte) Gagnep.
- Brucea trichotoma Spreng.
