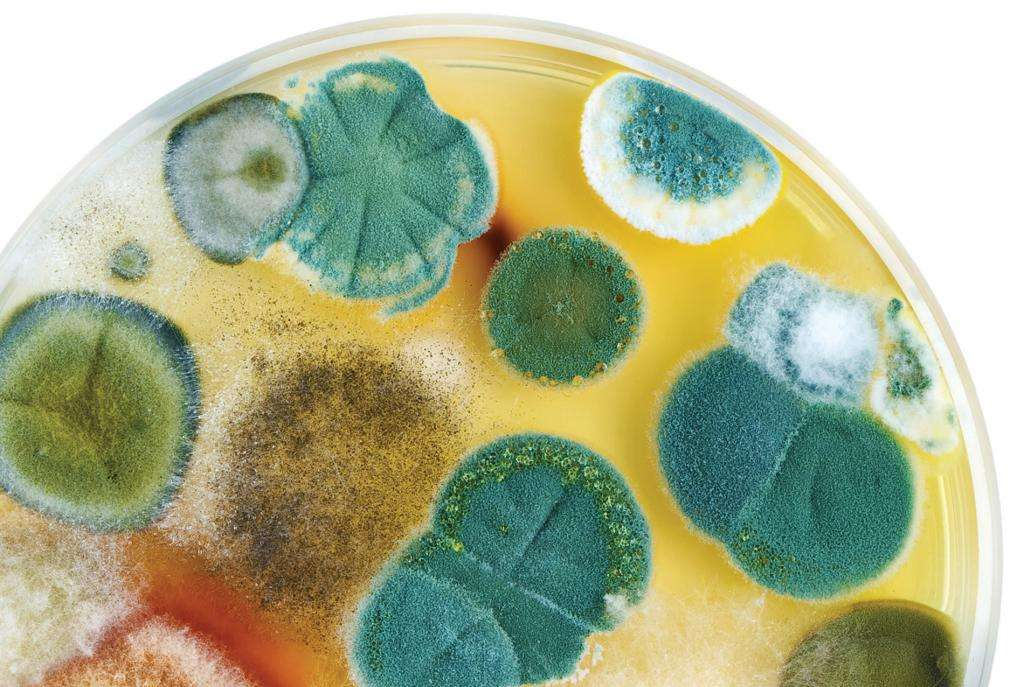
- A petri dish growing various molds

Scientific classification
- Kingdom: Fungi
- Division: Ascomycota
- Class: Eurotiomycetes
- Order: Eurotiales
- Family: Aspergillaceae; Link (1826)

Type genus
- Aspergillus P.Micheli ex Haller (1768)

Genera
- Aspergillago; Aspergillus; Capsulotheca; Dichlaena; Eurotium; Evansstolkia; Hamigera; Leiothecium; Monascus; Penicilliopsis; Penicillium; Phialomyces; Pseudohamigera; Pseudopenicillium; Sclerocleista; Warcupiella; Xerochrysium; Xeromyces

= Aspergillaceae =

Family of fungi

The Aspergillaceae are a family of fungi in the order Eurotiales which are commonly known as the blue and green molds. The family includes the commonly known and observed genera of Aspergillus and Penicillium, amongst other lesser known mold genera but also includes larger ascomycete fungi such as Penicilliopsis.

== Taxonomy ==
The family was circumscribed in 1824 by the German botanist Johann Heinrich Friedrich Link.

Aspergillus

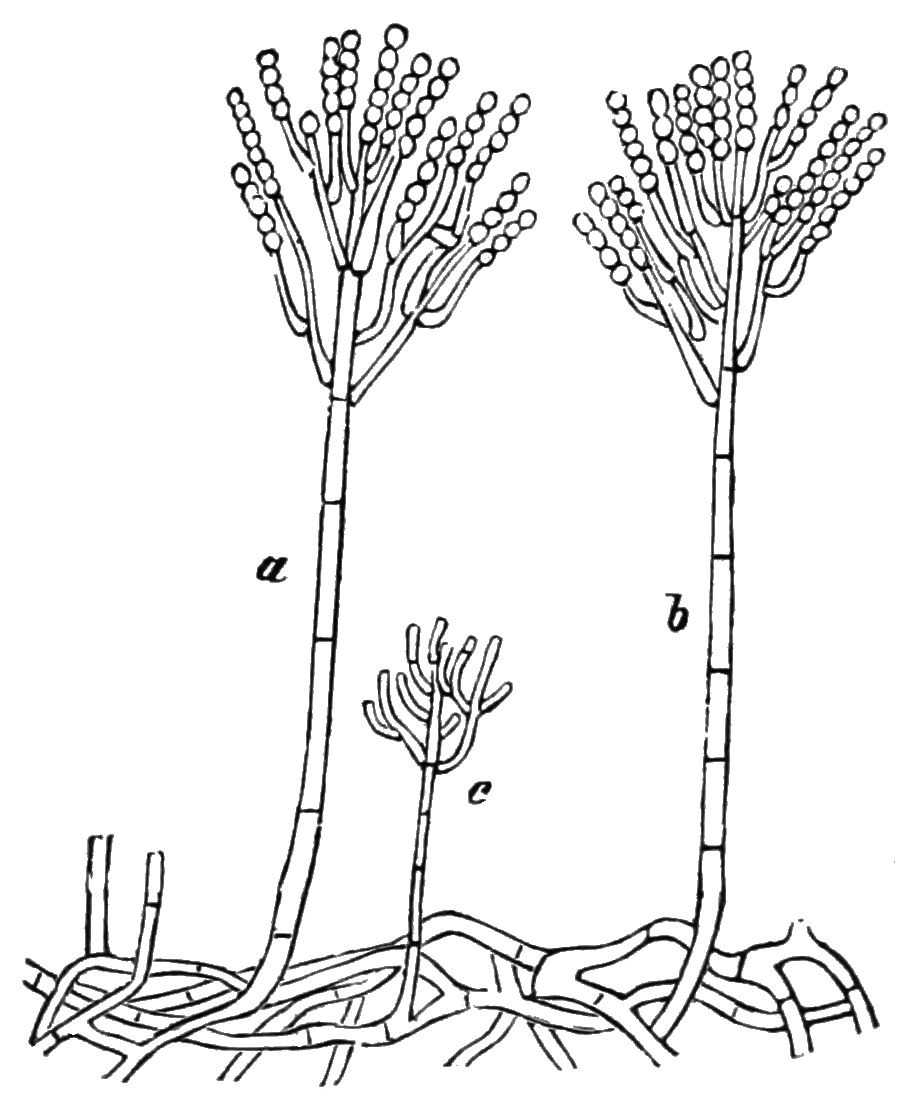
Penicillium
