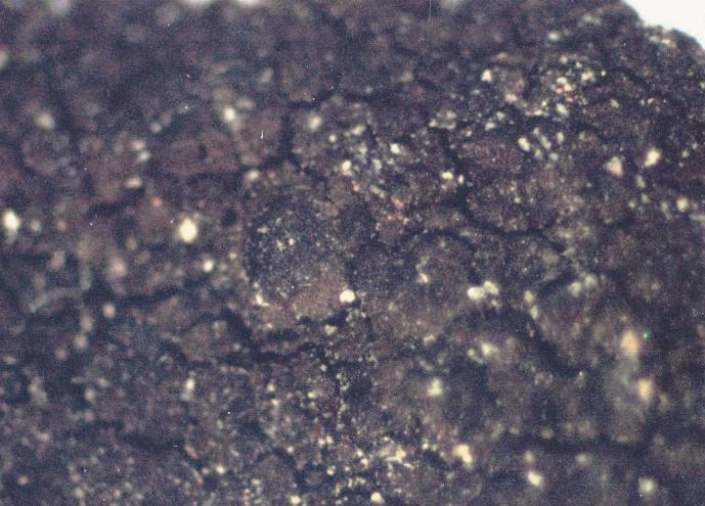
- Verrucaria nigrescens

Scientific classification
- Kingdom: Fungi
- Division: Ascomycota
- (unranked): Dothideomyceta
- Class: Eurotiomycetes; O.E. Erikss. & Winka 1997

Subclasses
- Chaetothyriomycetidae; Coryneliomycetidae; Cryptocaliciomycetidae; Eurotiomycetidae; Mycocaliciomycetidae; Sclerococcomycetidae; ?Neocladophialophora

= Eurotiomycetes =

Class of fungi

Eurotiomycetes is a large class of ascomycetes with cleistothecial ascocarps within the subphylum Pezizomycotina, currently containing around 3810 species according to the Catalogue of Life. It is the third largest lichenized class, with more than 1200 lichen species that are mostly bitunicate in the formation of asci. It contains most of the fungi previously known morphologically as "Plectomycetes".

== Systematics and phylogeny ==
=== Internal relationships ===
The class Eurotiomycetes was circumscribed in 1997 by Swedish mycologists Ove Erik Eriksson and Katarina Winka. At that time it only contained the order Eurotiales, which together with the next order added, Onygenales, form a monophyletic group comprising most of the fungi in "Plectomycetes", a group no longer in use that unified fungi under exclusively morphological characteristics.

As more orders were added to Eurotiomycetes, the first two along with Arachnomycetales became constrained to the first subclass, Eurotiomycetidae. In 2001, the second subclass, Chaetothyriomycetidae, was erected to accommodate Chaetothyriales and its sister group Verrucariales, as well as Pyrenulales since 2004. These two remain as the major subclasses of Eurotiomycetes.

The remaining subclasses were created through more phylogenetic analyses to accommodate outlying taxa or newly discovered groups: Mycocaliciomycetidae in 2007, Coryneliomycetidae and Sclerococcomycetidae in 2016, and lastly Cryptocaliciomycetidae in 2021. The following cladogram shows the relationships between all Eurotiomycetes orders and monotypic subclasses as of 2021:

- - - Eurotiomycetes
      - - - - Chaetothyriomycetidae
              - - Chaetothyriales
                - Verrucariales
              - - Phaeomoniellales
                - Pyrenulales
          - - - - Eurotiomycetidae
                  - - Onygenales
                    - Arachnomycetales
                  - Eurotiales
              - Cryptocaliciomycetidae
            - Coryneliomycetidae
        - Sclerococcomycetidae
      - Mycocaliciomycetidae
  - Lecanoromycetes

=== External relationships ===
The class Eurotiomycetes forms a clade with Lecanoromycetes, the largest lichenized class of fungi.

== Taxonomy ==
As of 2022, the taxonomy of Eurotiomycetes recognizes 5 subclasses, 10 orders, 34 families and 289 valid genera. The families are listed here followed by the number of genera.

Subclass Chaetothyriomycetidae Doweld 2001

Order Chaetothyriales M.E. Barr 1987

Family Chaetothyriaceae Hansf. ex M.E. Barr 1979 – 19 genera
Family Coccodiniaceae Höhn. ex O.E. Erikss. – 4 genera
Family Cyphellophoraceae Réblová & Unter. – 2 genera
Family Epibryaceae S. Stenroos & Gueidan – 1 genus
Family Herpotrichiellaceae Munk – 17 genera
Family Lyrommataceae Lücking – 1 genus
Family Microtheliopsidaceae O.E. Erikss. – 1 genus
Family Paracladophialophoraceae Crous – 1 genus
Family Pyrenotrichaceae Zahlbr – 2 genera
Family Trichomeriaceae Chomnunti & K.D. Hyde (=Strelitzianaceae Crous & M.J. Wingf.) – 9 genera
Chaetothyriales incertae sedis – 11 genera

Order Phaeomoniellales K.H. Chen, A.E. Arnold, Gueidan & Lutzoni

Family Celotheliaceae Lücking, Aptroot & Sipman (=Phaeomoniellaceae P.M. Kirk) – 11 genera

Order Pyrenulales Fink ex D. Hawksw. & O.E. Erikss.

Family Pyrenulaceae Rabenh. – 12 genera
Pyrenulales incertae sedis – 2 genera

Order Verrucariales Mattick ex D. Hawksw. & O.E. Erikss.

Family Adelococcaceae Triebel – 3 genera
Family Sarcopyreniaceae Nav.-Ros. & Cl. Roux – 1 genera
Family Verrucariaceae Zenker – 52 genera
Verrucariales incertae sedis – 4 genera

Chaetothyriomycetidae incertae sedis

Family Rhynchostomataceae Winka & O.E. Erikss. – 2 genera

Subclass Cryptocaliciomycetidae M. Prieto, Etayo and Olariaga 2021

Order Cryptocaliciales M. Prieto, Etayo and Olariaga 2021

Family Cryptocaliciaceae Etayo, Olariaga and M. Prieto – 1 genus

Subclass Coryneliomycetidae A.R. Wood, Damm, J.Z. Groenew., Cheew. & Crous

Order Coryneliales Seaver & Chardon

Family Coryneliaceae Sacc. ex Berl. & Voglino – 8 genera
Family Eremascaceae Engl. & E. Gilg – 2 genera

Subclass Eurotiomycetidae Geiser & Lutzoni

Order Arachnomycetales Gibas, Sigler & Currah

Family Arachnomycetaceae Gibas, Sigler & Currah – 2 genera

Order Eurotiales G.W. Martin ex Benny & Kimbr.

Family Aspergillaceae Link (=Monascaceae J. Schröt.) – 14 genera
Family Elaphomycetaceae Tul. ex Paol. – 2 genera
Family Penicillaginaceae Houbraken, Frisvad & Samson – 1 genus
Family Thermoascaceae Apinis – 2 genera
Family Trichocomaceae E. Fisch. – 9 genera

Order Onygenales Cif. ex Benny & Kimbr.

Family Ajellomycetaceae Unter., J.A. Scott & Sigler – 7 genera
Family Arthrodermataceae Currah – 11 genera
Family Ascosphaeraceae L.S. Olive & Spiltoir – 3 genera
Family Gymnoascaceae Baran. – 11 genera
Family Nannizziopsidaceae Guarro, Stchigel, Deanna A. Sutton & Cano – 1 genus
Family Onygenaceae Berk. – 34 genera
Family Spiromastigaceae Guarro, Cano & Stchigel – 4 genera
Onygenales incertae sedis – 3 genera

Eurotiomycetidae incertae sedis – 5 genera

Subclass Mycocaliciomycetidae Tibell

Order Mycocaliciales Tibell & Wedin

Family Mycocaliciaceae A.F.W. Schmidt (=Sphinctrinaceae M. Choisy) – 7 genera

Subclass Sclerococcomycetidae Réblová, Unter. & W. Gams

Order Sclerococcales Réblová, Unter. & W. Gams

Family Dactylosporaceae Bellem. & Hafellner (=Sclerococcaceae Réblová, Unter. & W. Gams) – 7 genera

Only one genus, Neocladophialophora, remains incertae sedis within the class.

== Nomenclature ==
The scientific classification for this particular class is particularly tricky, with one particular species having both the anamorph (asexual form), and teleomorph (sexual form) names used in reference to them.

- e.g. anamorph form = Penicillium; teleomorph form = Talaromyces or Eupenicillium.

== Morphology ==
Many members (Eurotiales, Onygenales) produce an enclosed structure cleistothecium within which they produce their spores.
