= Aspergillus spathulatus =

Scientific classification
- Kingdom: Fungi
- Division: Ascomycota
- Class: Eurotiomycetes
- Order: Eurotiales
- Family: Aspergillaceae
- Genus: Aspergillus
- Species: A. spathulatus

Binomial name
- Aspergillus spathulatus Takada & Udagawa (1985)

Species of fungus

Aspergillus spathulatus is a species of fungus in the genus Aspergillus. It is from the Fumigati section. Several fungi from this section produce heat-resistant ascospores, and the isolates from this section are frequently obtained from locations where natural fires have previously occurred. The species was first described in 1985. It has been reported to produce aszonalenins and xanthocillins.

== Growth and morphology ==
A. spathulatus has been cultivated on both Czapek yeast extract agar (CYA) plates and Malt Extract Agar Oxoid® (MEAOX) plates. The growth morphology of the colonies can be seen in the pictures below.

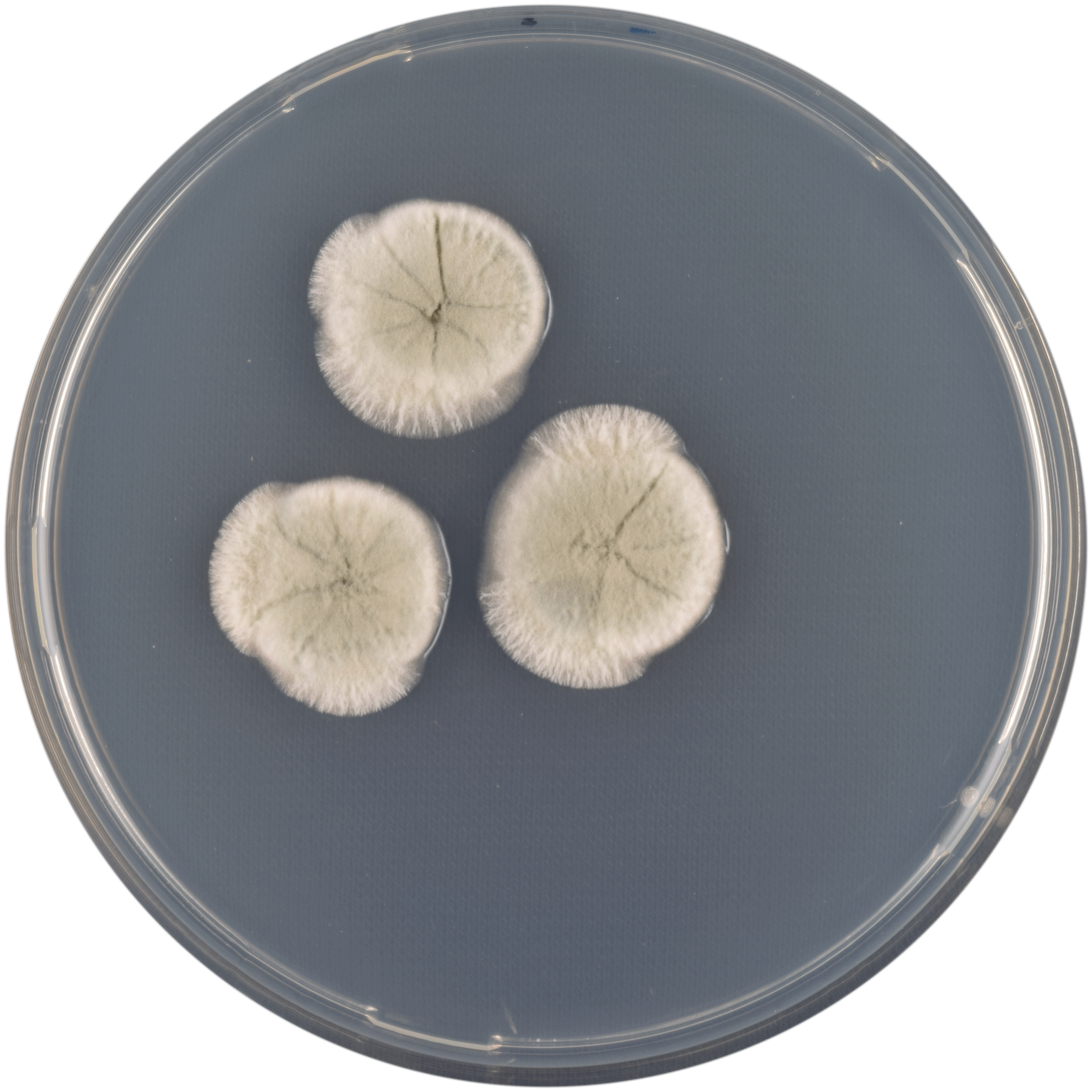
Aspergillus spathulatus growing on CYA plate

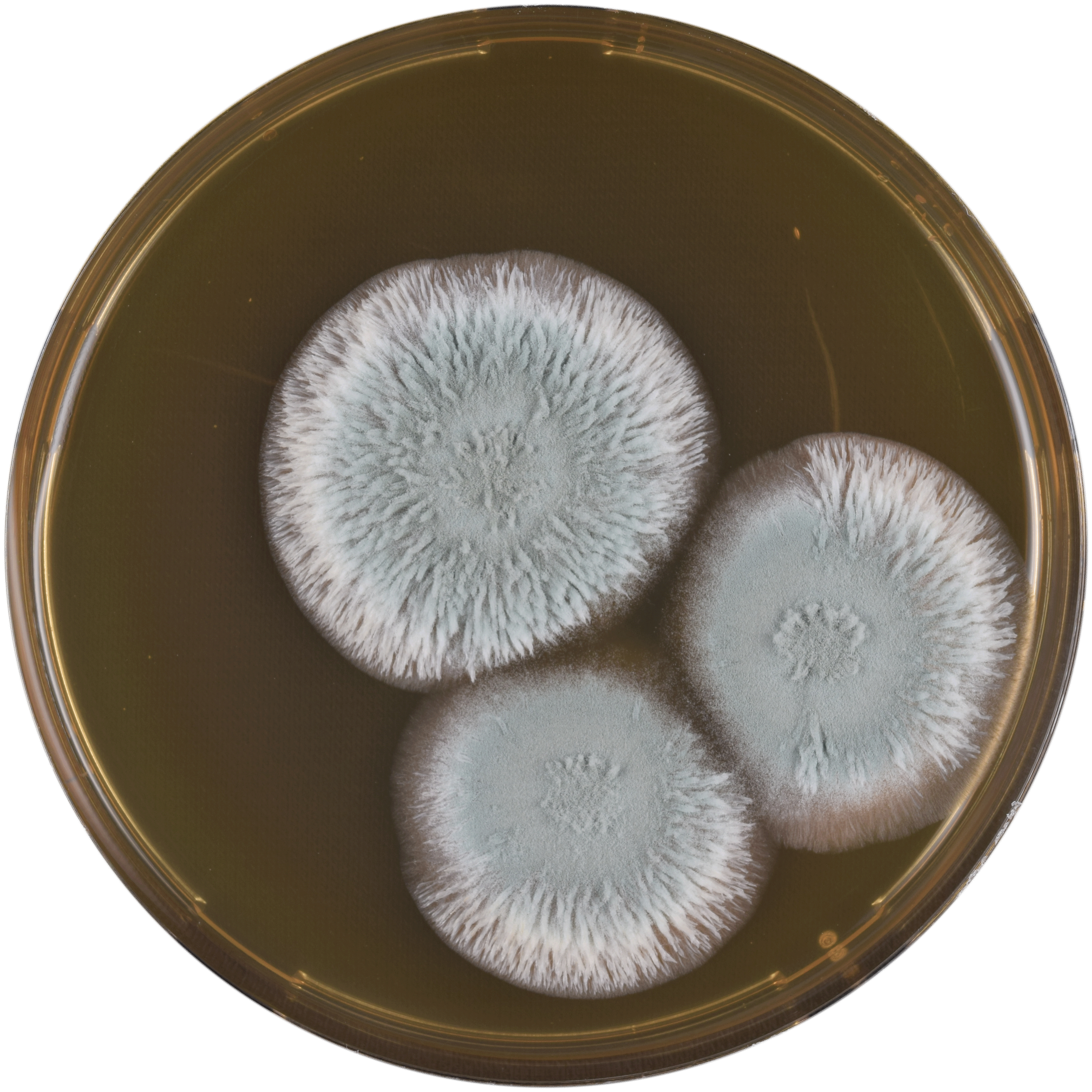
Aspergillus spathulatus growing on MEAOX plate
