= Aspergillus botucatensis =

Scientific classification
- Kingdom: Fungi
- Division: Ascomycota
- Class: Eurotiomycetes
- Order: Eurotiales
- Family: Aspergillaceae
- Genus: Aspergillus
- Species: A. botucatensis

Binomial name
- Aspergillus botucatensis Y. Horie, Miyaji & Nishimura (1995)

Synonyms
- Neosartorya spinosa

Species of fungus

Aspergillus botucatensis (also known as Neosartorya spinosa) is a species of fungus in the genus Aspergillus. It is from the Fumigati section. The species was first described in 1995. It has been reported to produce aszonalenins, 2-pyrovoylaminobenzamide, and pseurotin.

== Growth and morphology ==
A. botucatensis has been cultivated on both Czapek yeast extract agar (CYA) plates and Malt Extract Agar Oxoid® (MEAOX) plates. The growth morphology of the colonies can be seen in the pictures below.

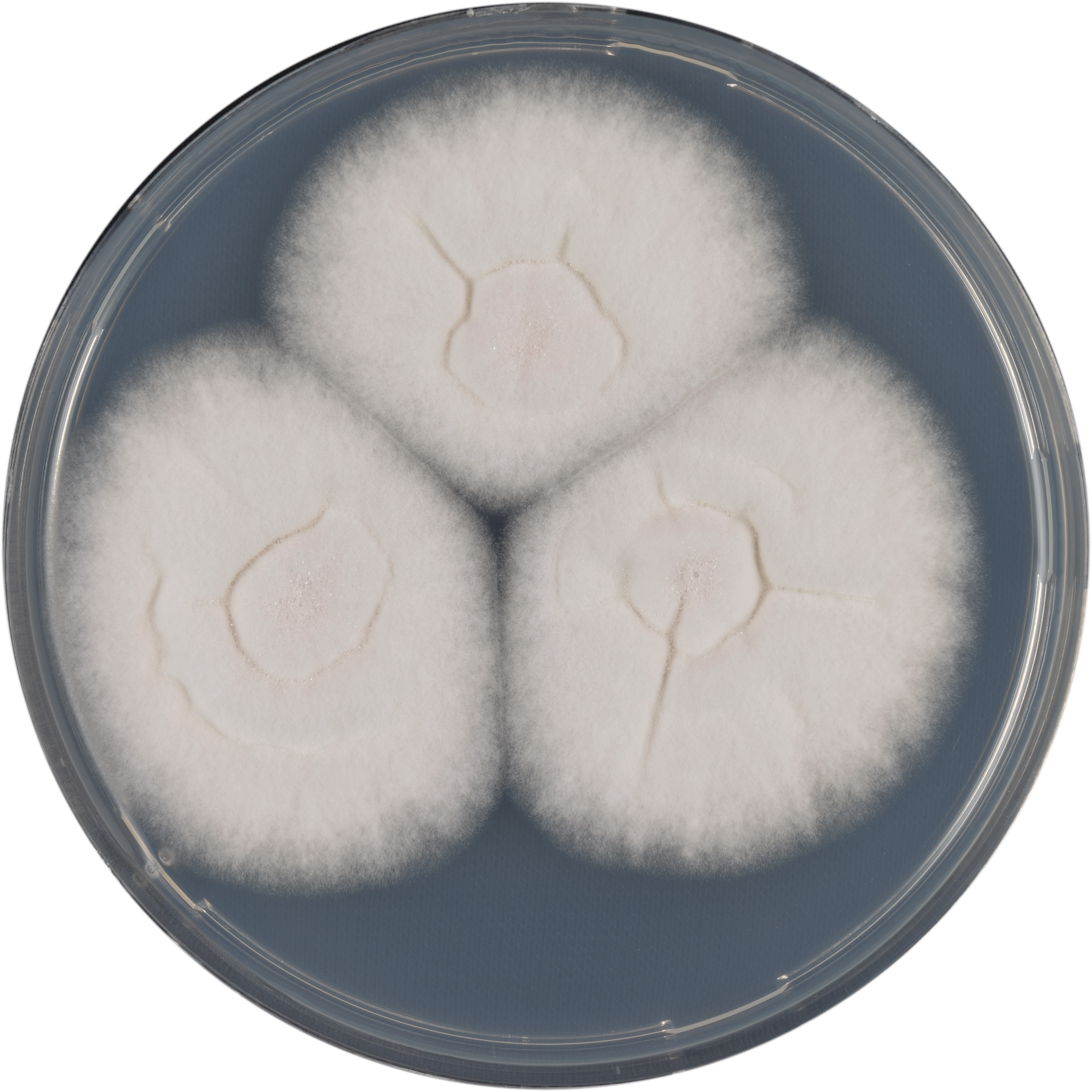
Aspergillus botucatensis growing on CYA plate

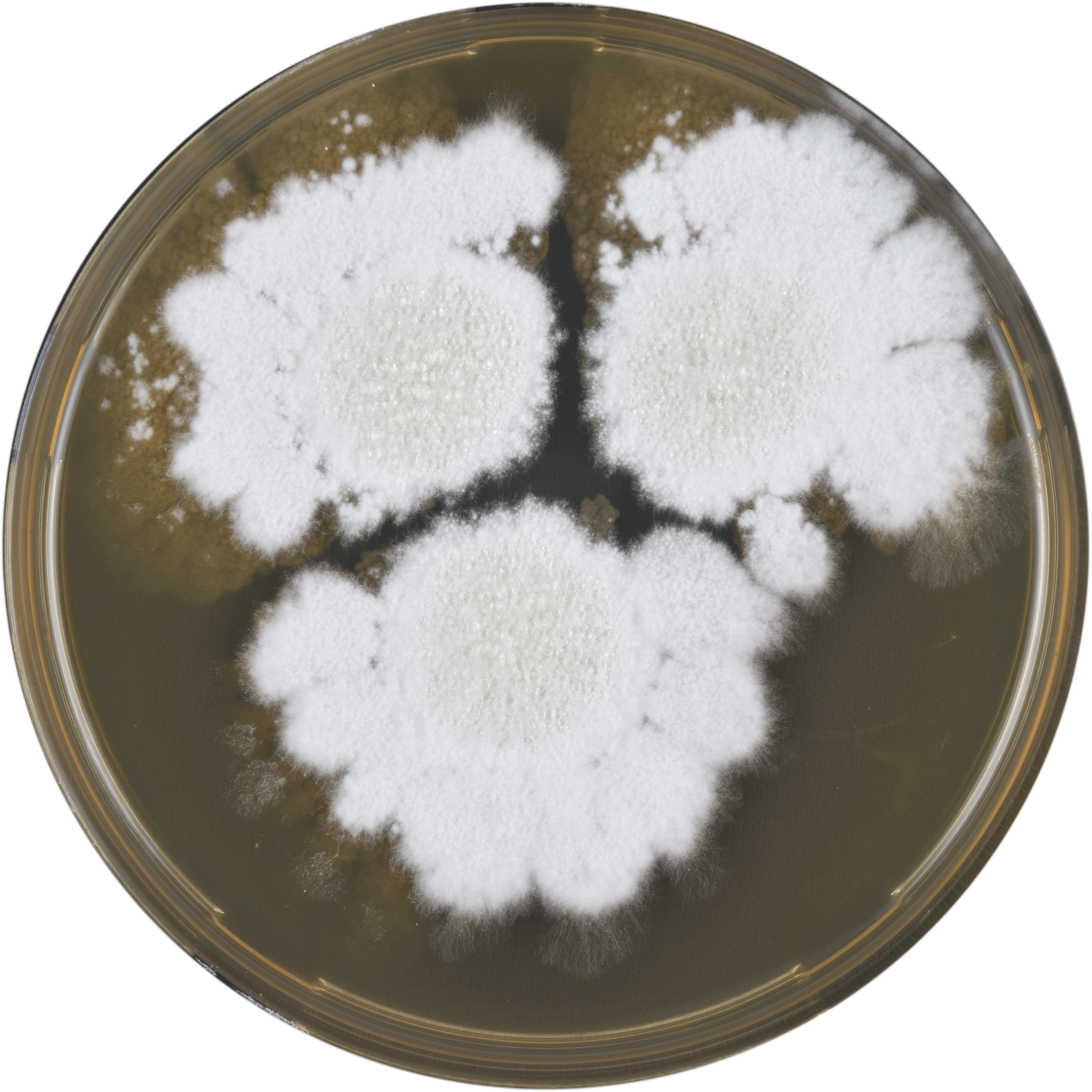
Aspergillus botucatensis growing on MEAOX plate
