= Aspergillus australensis =

Scientific classification
- Kingdom: Fungi
- Division: Ascomycota
- Class: Eurotiomycetes
- Order: Eurotiales
- Family: Aspergillaceae
- Genus: Aspergillus
- Species: A. australensis

Binomial name
- Aspergillus australensis (Samson, S.B. Hong & Varga) Houbraken, Visagie & Samson (2007)

Synonyms
- Neosartorya australensis

Species of fungus

Aspergillus australensis is a species of fungus in the genus Aspergillus. It is from the Fumigati section. The species was first described in 2007. Aspergillus australensis produces aszonalenins and wortmannins.

== Growth and morphology ==
A. australensis has been cultivated on both Czapek yeast extract agar (CYA) plates and Malt Extract Agar Oxoid® (MEAOX) plates. The growth morphology of the colonies can be seen in the pictures below.

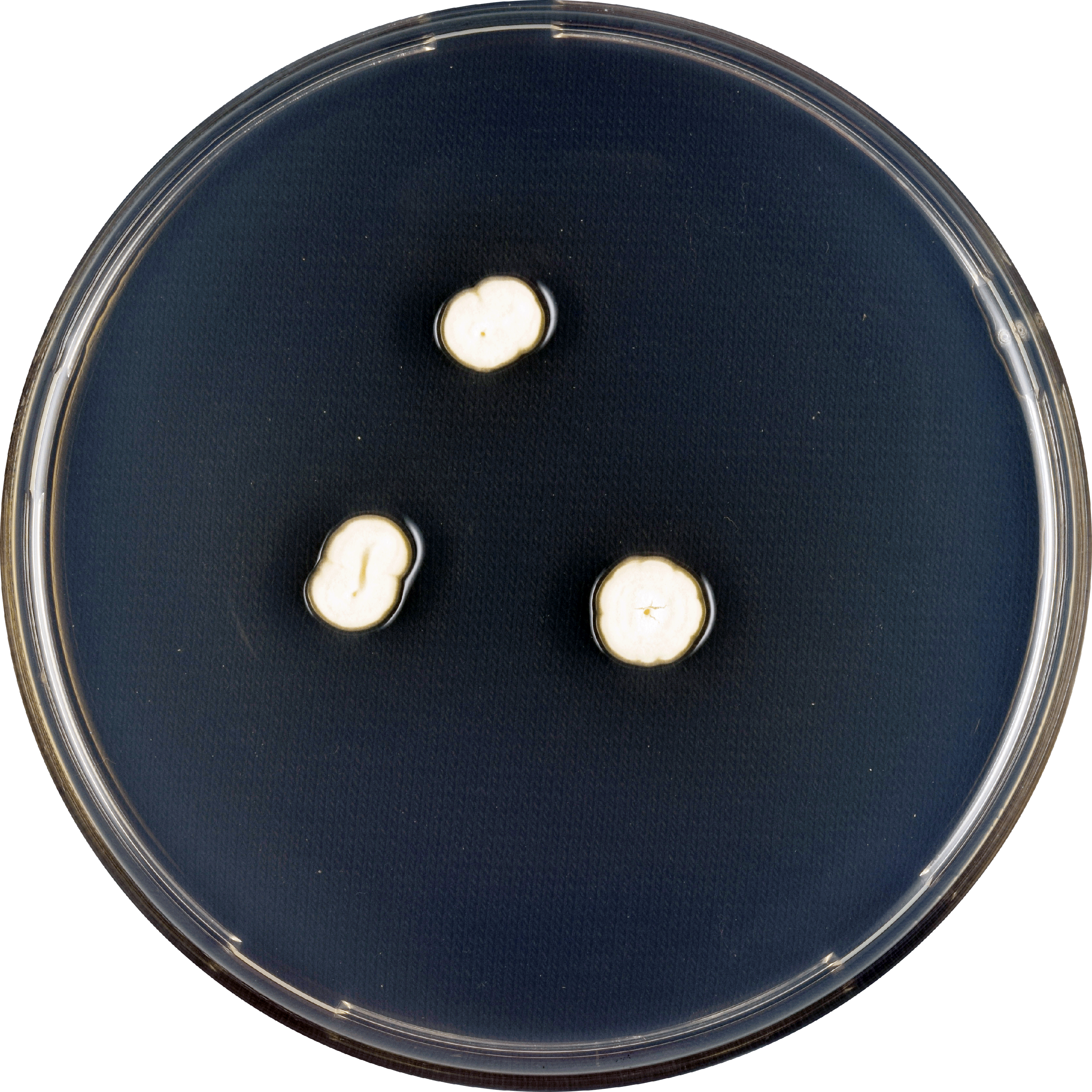
Aspergillus australensis growing on CYA plate

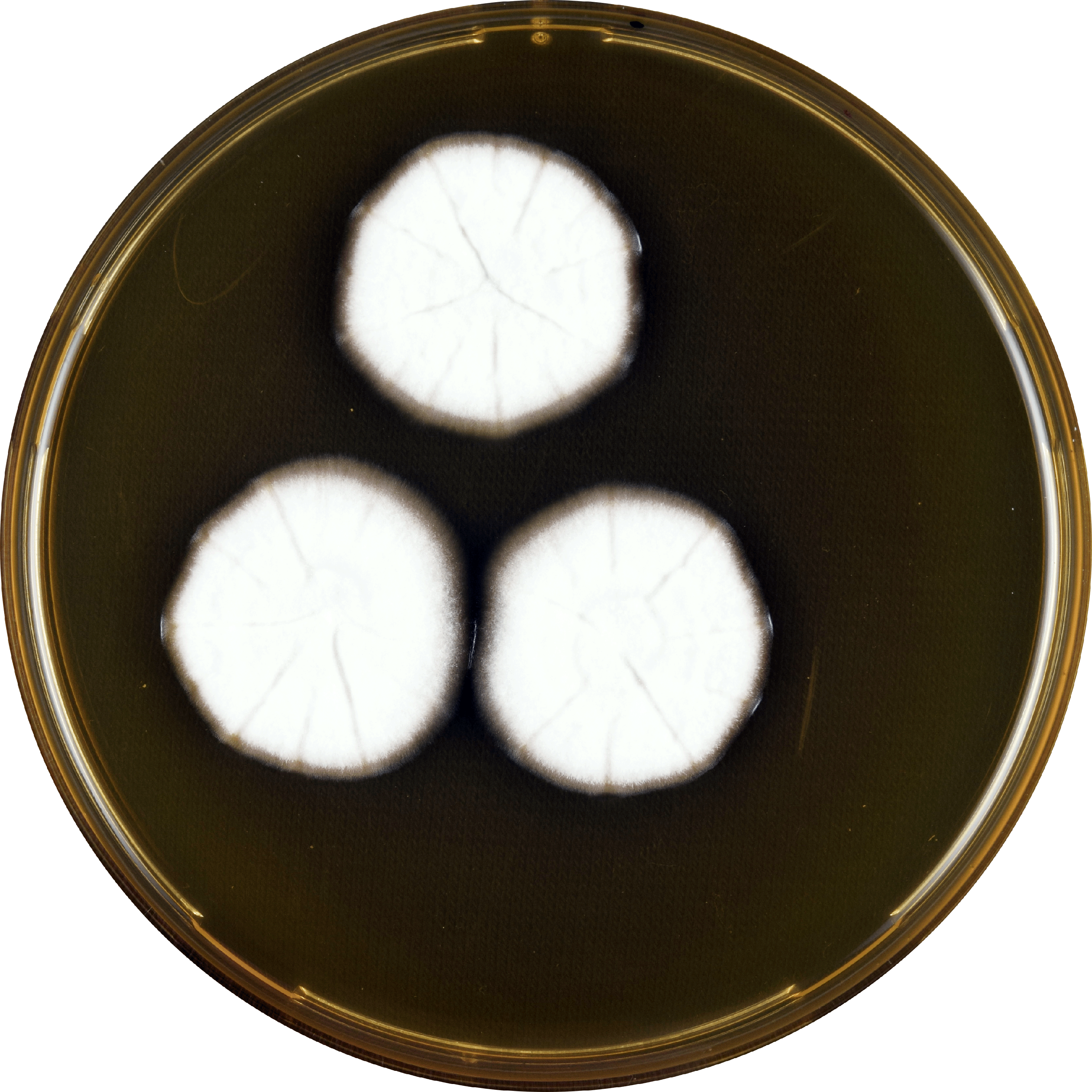
Aspergillus australensis growing on MEAOX plate
