= Aspergillus primulinus =

Scientific classification
- Kingdom: Fungi
- Division: Ascomycota
- Class: Eurotiomycetes
- Order: Eurotiales
- Family: Aspergillaceae
- Genus: Aspergillus
- Species: A. primulinus

Binomial name
- Aspergillus primulinus Udagawa, Toyazaki & Tsubouchi (1993)

Synonyms
- Neosartorya quadricincta and Neosartorya primulina

Species of fungus

Aspergillus primulinus (also named Neosartorya quadricincta and Neosartorya primulina) is a species of fungus in the genus Aspergillus. It is from the Fumigati section. Several fungi from this section produce heat-resistant ascospores, and the isolates from this section are frequently obtained from locations where natural fires have previously occurred. The species was first described in 1993. It has been reported to produce quinolactacin and aszonalenins.

== Growth and morphology ==
A. primulinus has been cultivated on both Czapek yeast extract agar (CYA) plates and Malt Extract Agar Oxoid® (MEAOX) plates. The growth morphology of the colonies can be seen in the pictures below.

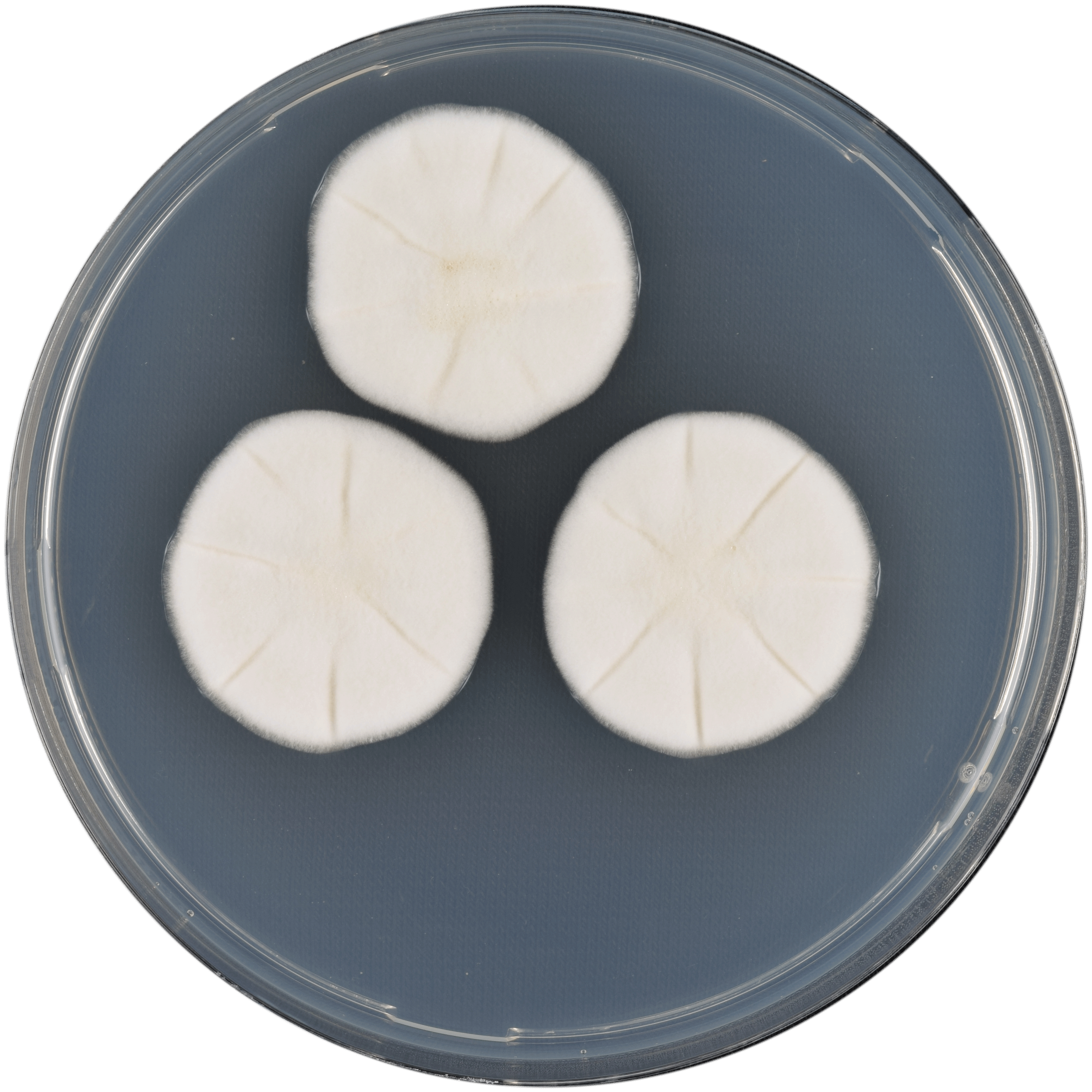
Aspergillus primulinus growing on CYA plate

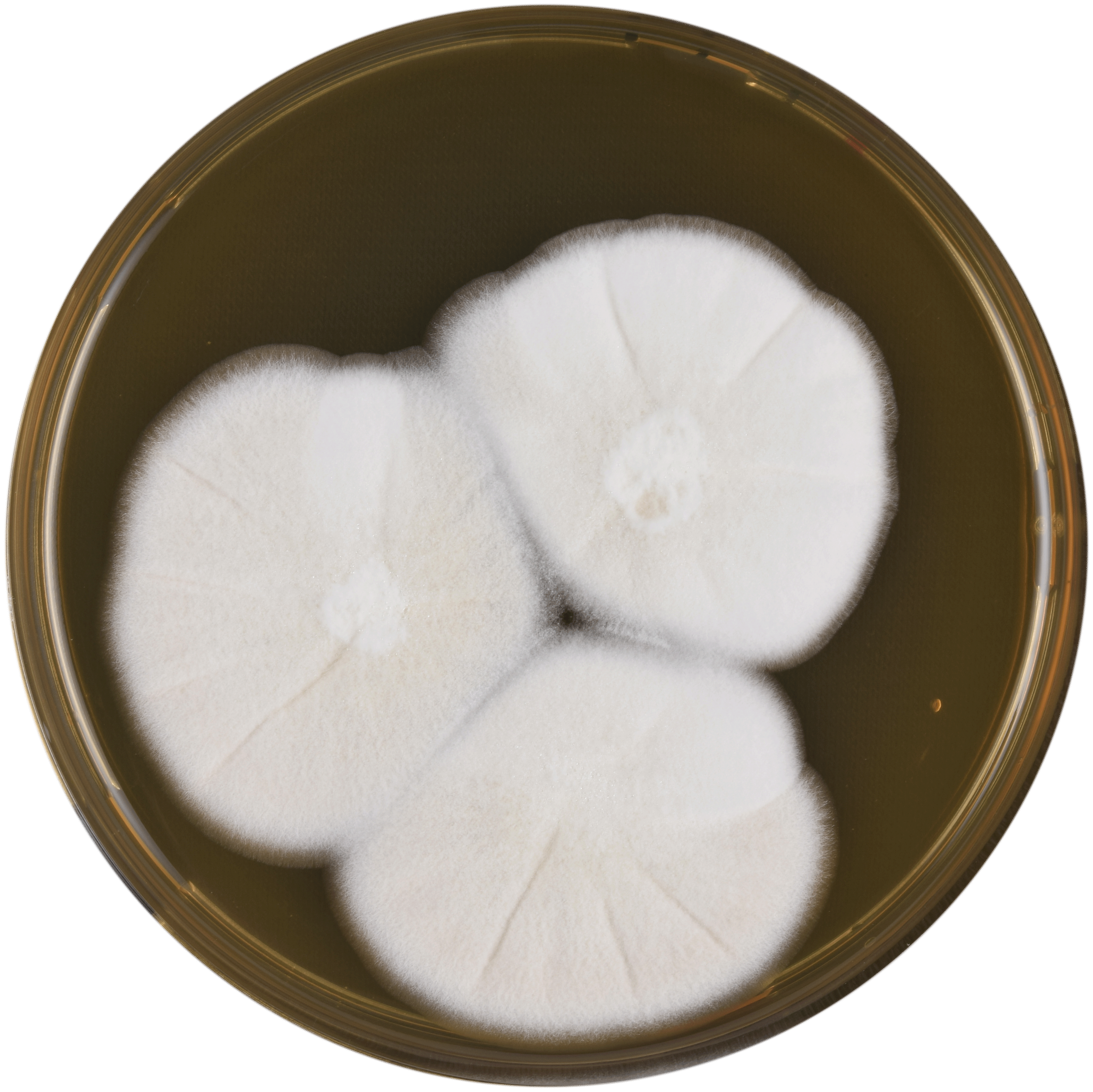
Aspergillus primulinus growing on MEAOX plate
