= Aspergillus solicola =

Scientific classification
- Kingdom: Fungi
- Division: Ascomycota
- Class: Eurotiomycetes
- Order: Eurotiales
- Family: Aspergillaceae
- Genus: Aspergillus
- Species: A. solicola

Binomial name
- Aspergillus solicola Samson, Visagie & Houbraken (2014)

Species of fungus

Aspergillus solicola is a species of fungus in the genus Aspergillus. It is from the Fumigati section. Several fungi from this section produce heat-resistant ascospores, and the isolates from this section are frequently obtained from locations where natural fires have previously occurred. The species was first described in 2014. It has been reported to produce aszonalenins, chromanols, tryptoquivalines, tryptoquivalones, and wortmannins.
