= Aspergillus floccosus =

Scientific classification
- Kingdom: Fungi
- Division: Ascomycota
- Class: Eurotiomycetes
- Order: Eurotiales
- Family: Aspergillaceae
- Genus: Aspergillus
- Species: A. floccosus

Binomial name
- Aspergillus floccosus (Y.K. Shih) Samson, S.W. Peterson, Frisvad & Varga (2011)

Species of fungus

Aspergillus floccosus is a species of fungus in the genus Aspergillus. It is from the Terrei section. The species was first described in 2011. It has been reported to produce aszonalenin, butyrolactones, citrinin, a decaturin, dihydrocitrinone, an isocoumarin, and serantrypinone.

== Growth and morphology ==
A. floccosus has been cultivated on both Czapek yeast extract agar (CYA) plates and Malt Extract Agar Oxoid® (MEAOX) plates. The growth morphology of the colonies can be seen in the pictures below.

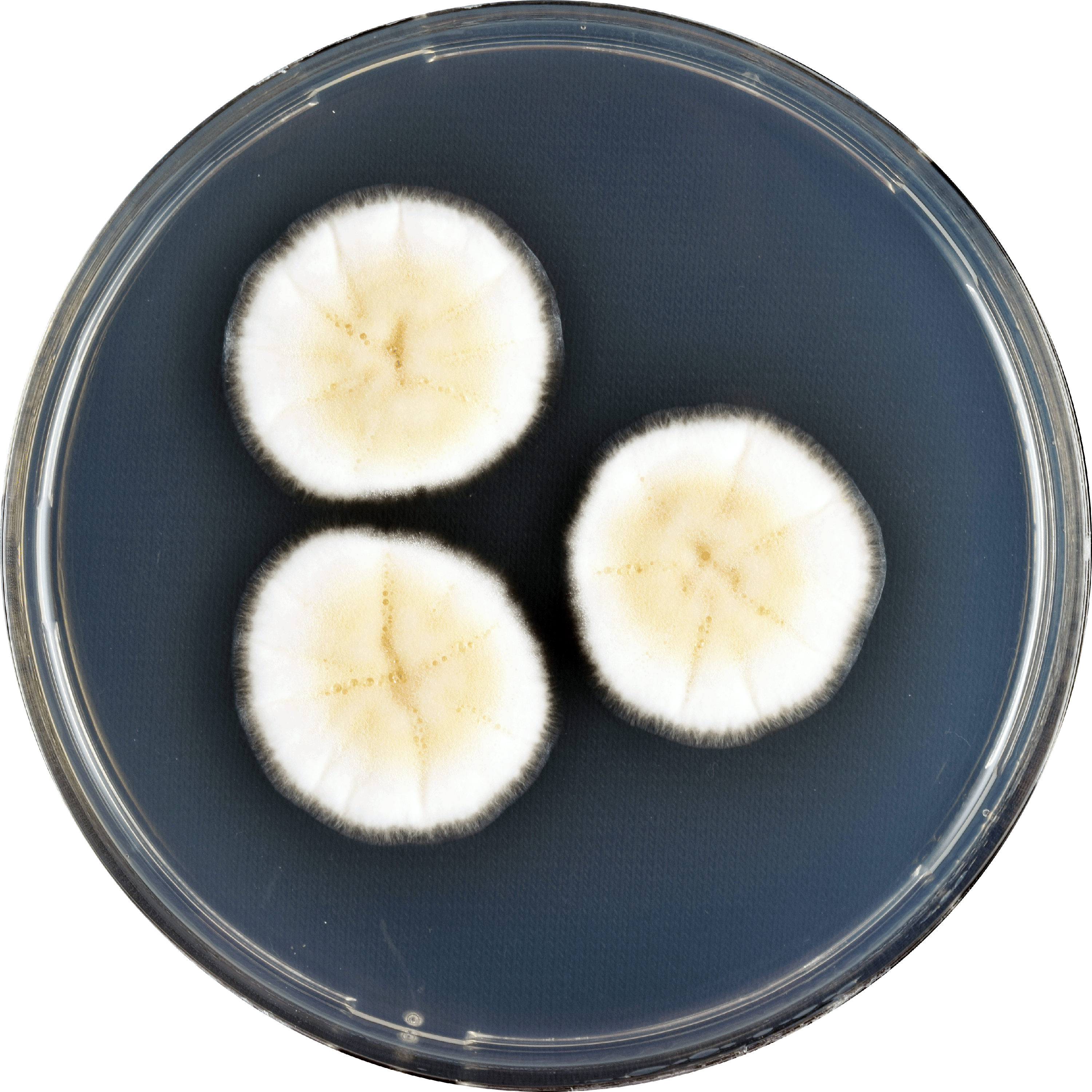
Aspergillus floccosus growing on CYA plate

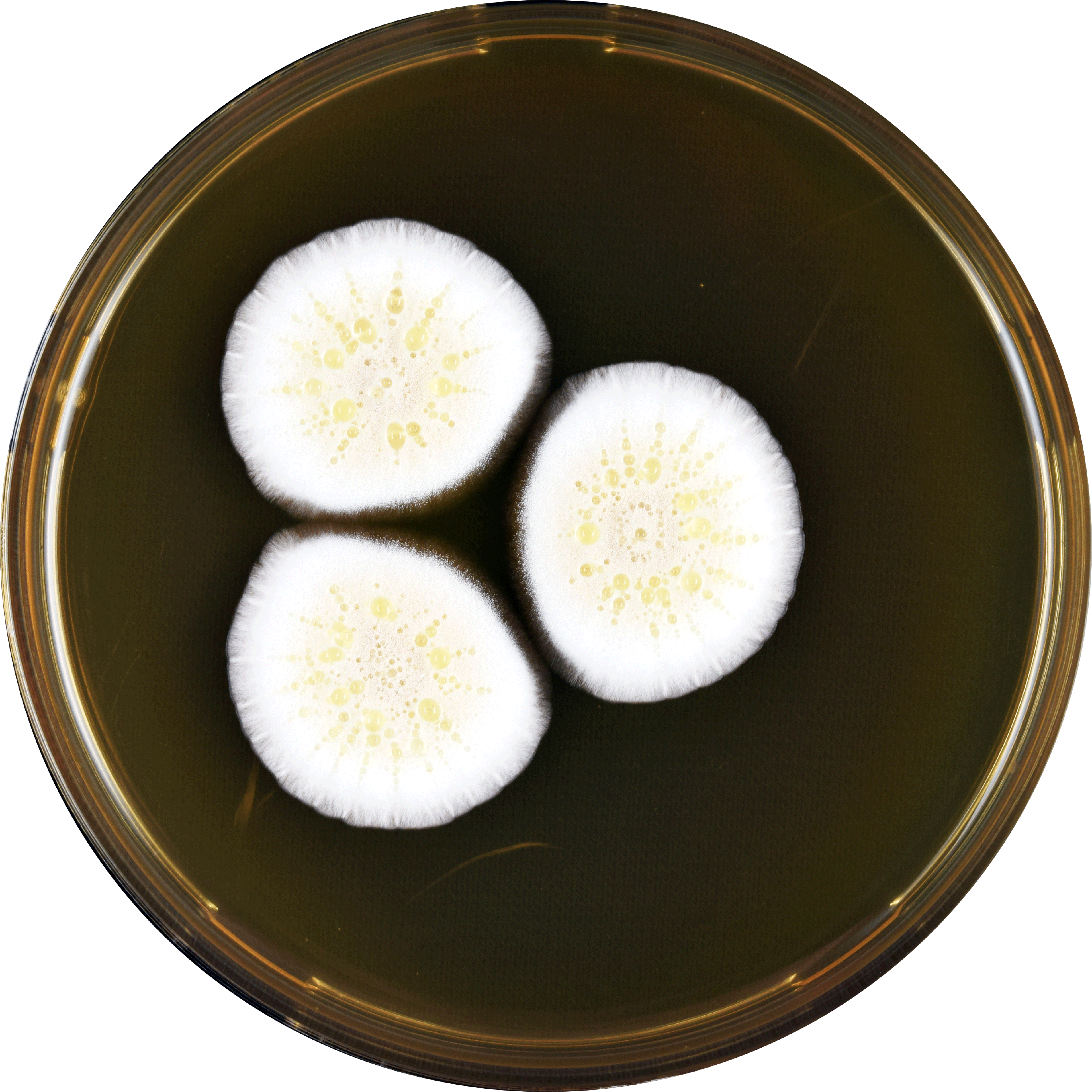
Aspergillus floccosus growing on MEAOX plate
