= Aspergillus laciniosus =

Scientific classification
- Kingdom: Fungi
- Division: Ascomycota
- Class: Eurotiomycetes
- Order: Eurotiales
- Family: Aspergillaceae
- Genus: Aspergillus
- Species: A. laciniosus

Binomial name
- Aspergillus laciniosus S.B. Hong, Frisvad & Samson (2006)

Synonyms
- Neosartorya laciniosa

Species of fungus

Aspergillus laciniosus (also named Neosartorya laciniosa) is a species of fungus in the genus Aspergillus. It is from the Fumigati section. The species was first described in 2006. It has been reported to produce aszonalenins, tryptoquivaline, and tryptoquivalone.

== Growth and morphology ==
A. laciniosus has been cultivated on both Czapek yeast extract agar (CYA) plates and Malt Extract Agar Oxoid® (MEAOX) plates. The growth morphology of the colonies can be seen in the pictures below.

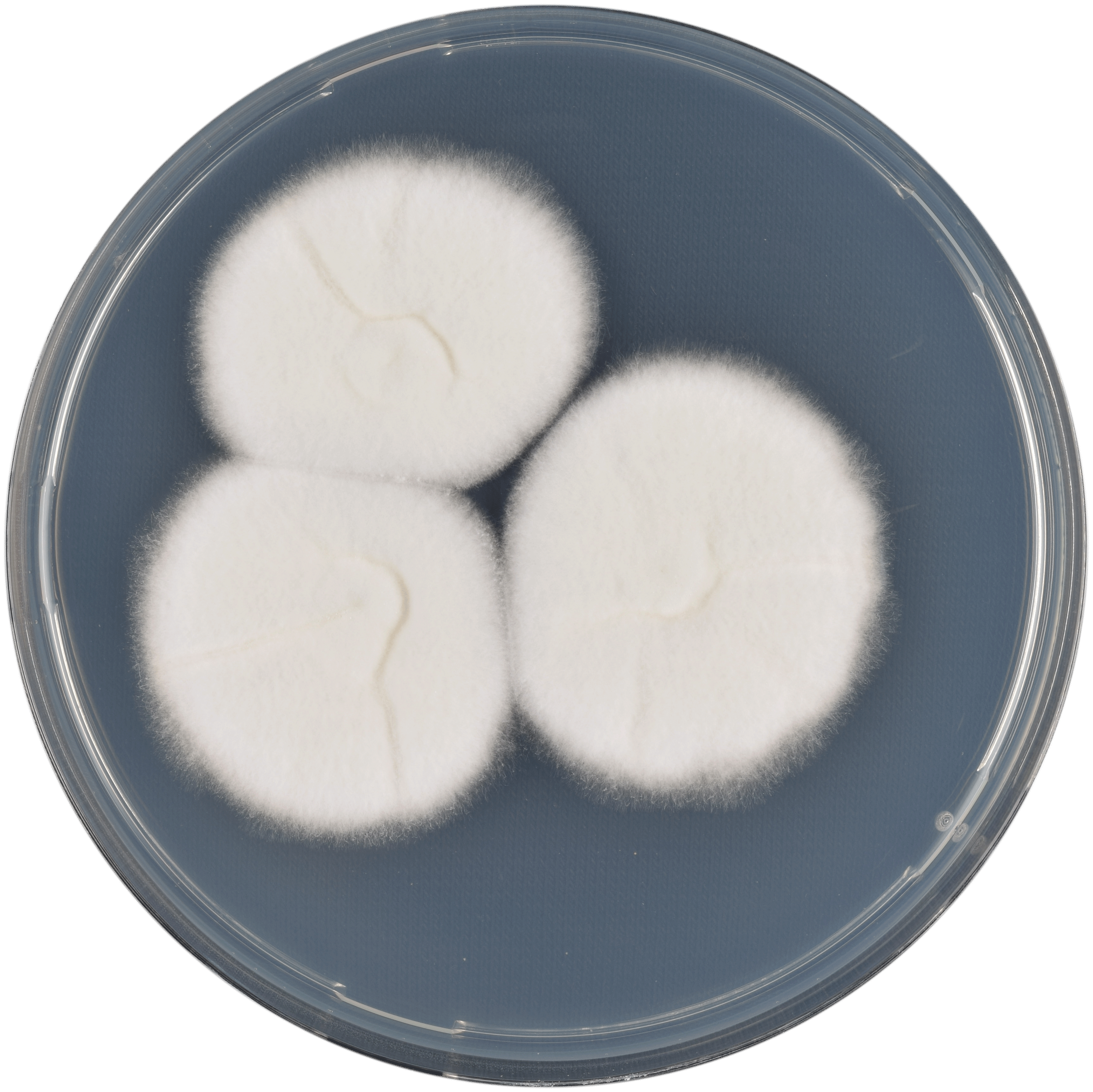
Aspergillus laciniosus growing on CYA plate

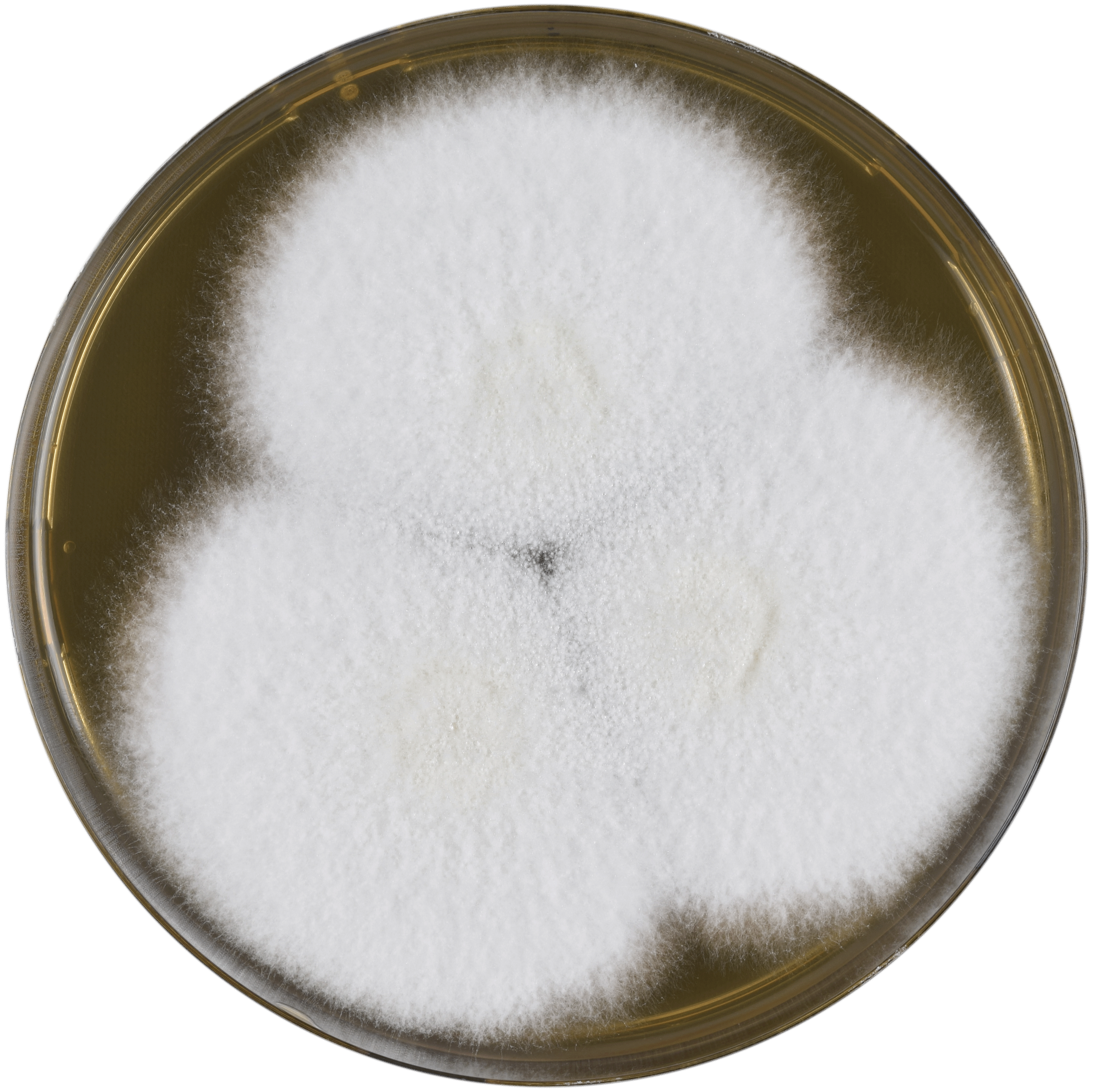
Aspergillus laciniosus growing on MEAOX plate
