= Aspergillus tatenoi =

Scientific classification
- Kingdom: Fungi
- Division: Ascomycota
- Class: Eurotiomycetes
- Order: Eurotiales
- Family: Aspergillaceae
- Genus: Aspergillus
- Species: A. tatenoi

Binomial name
- Aspergillus tatenoi Y. Horie, Miyaji, Koji Yokoyama, Udagawa & Campos-Takagi (1992)

Species of fungus

Aspergillus tatenoi is a species of fungus in the genus Aspergillus. It is from the Fumigati section. Several fungi from this section produce heat-resistant ascospores, and the isolates from this section are frequently obtained from locations where natural fires have previously occurred. The species was first described in 1992. It has been reported to produce aszonalenin, aszonapyrone A, aszonapyrone B, and tatenoic acid.

== Growth and morphology ==
A. tatenoi has been cultivated on both Czapek yeast extract agar (CYA) plates and Malt Extract Agar Oxoid® (MEAOX) plates. The growth morphology of the colonies can be seen in the pictures below.

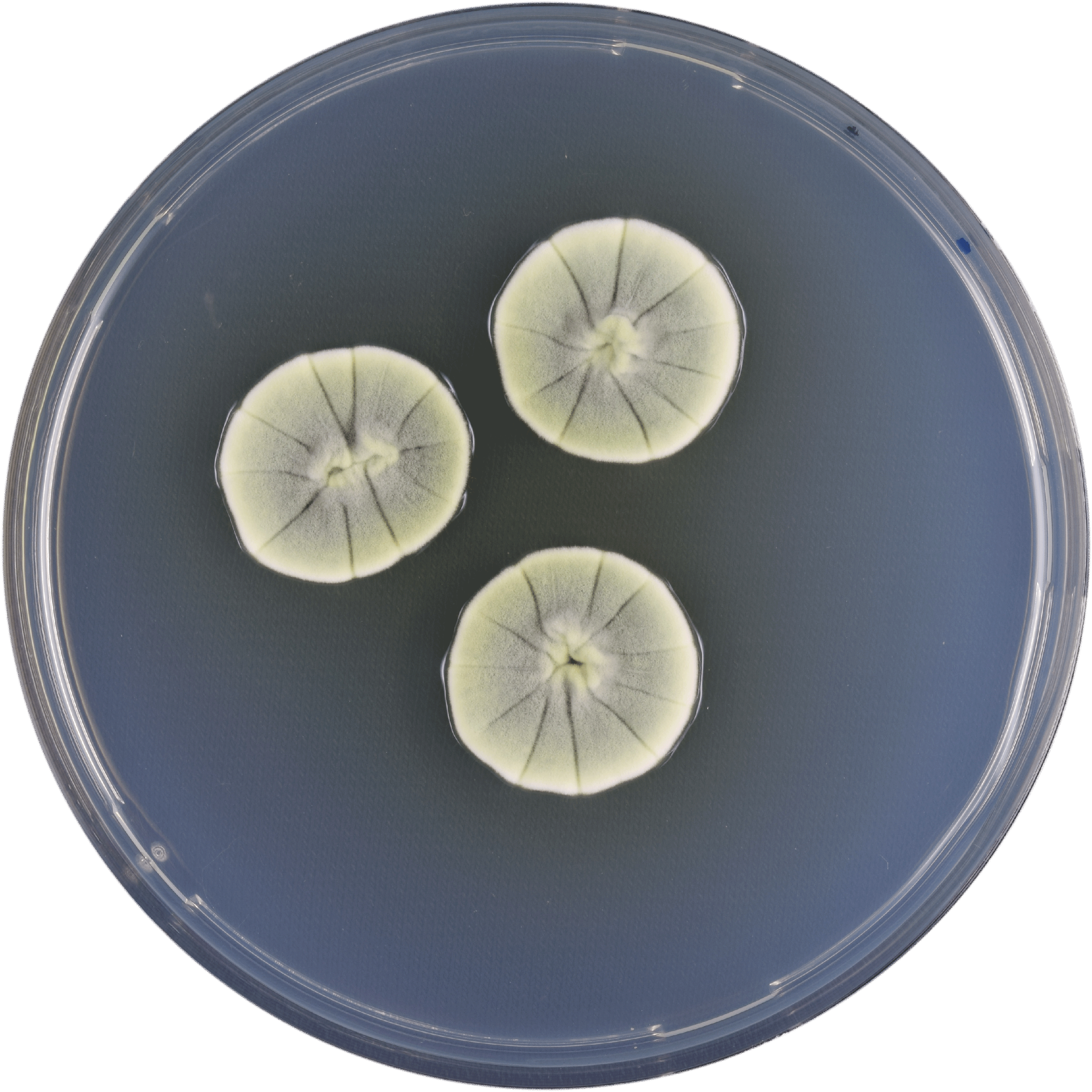
Aspergillus tatenoi growing on CYA plate

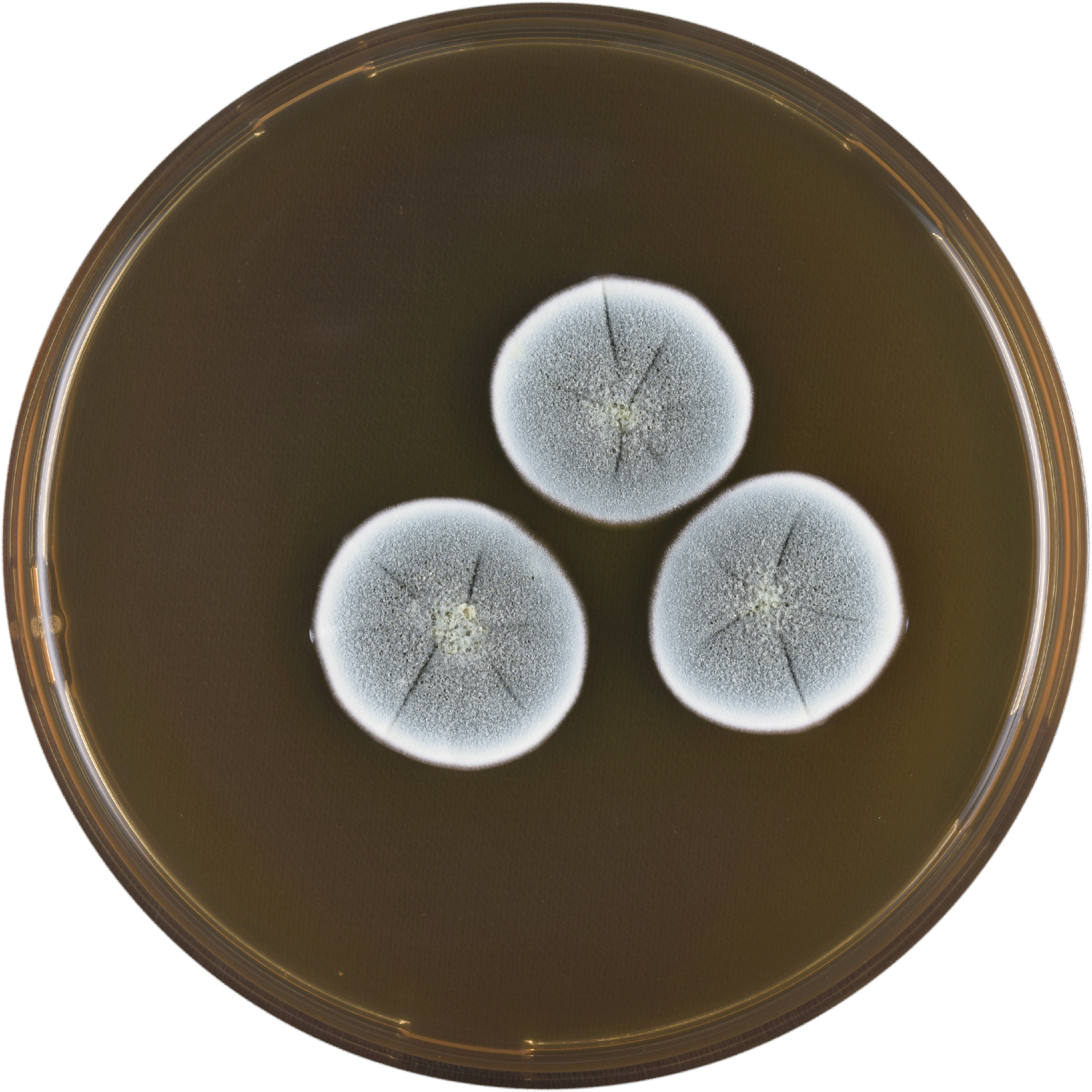
Aspergillus tatenoi growing on MEAOX plate
