= Aspergillus ferenczii =

Scientific classification
- Kingdom: Fungi
- Division: Ascomycota
- Class: Eurotiomycetes
- Order: Eurotiales
- Family: Aspergillaceae
- Genus: Aspergillus
- Species: A. ferenczii

Binomial name
- Aspergillus ferenczii (Varga & Samson) Samson, Varga, Visagie & Houbraken (2014)

Species of fungus

Aspergillus ferenczii is a species of fungus in the genus Aspergillus. It is from the Fumigati section. The species was first described in 2014. It has been reported to produce asperfuran, aszonalenin, fumigaclavine, viridicatumtoxin, and fumigatins.

== Growth and morphology ==
A. ferenczii has been cultivated on both Czapek yeast extract agar (CYA) plates and Malt Extract Agar Oxoid® (MEAOX) plates. The growth morphology of the colonies can be seen in the pictures below.

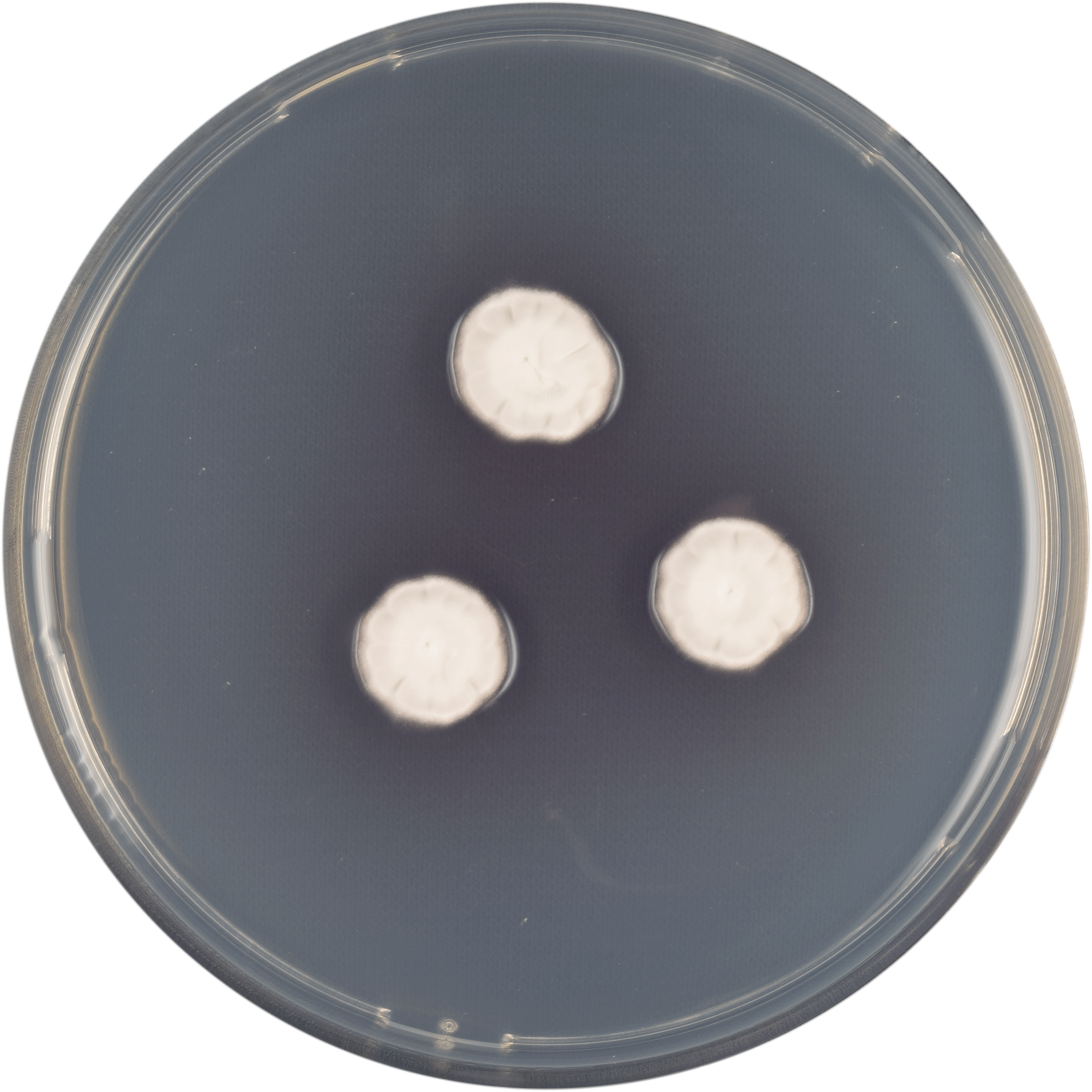
Aspergillus ferenczii growing on CYA plate

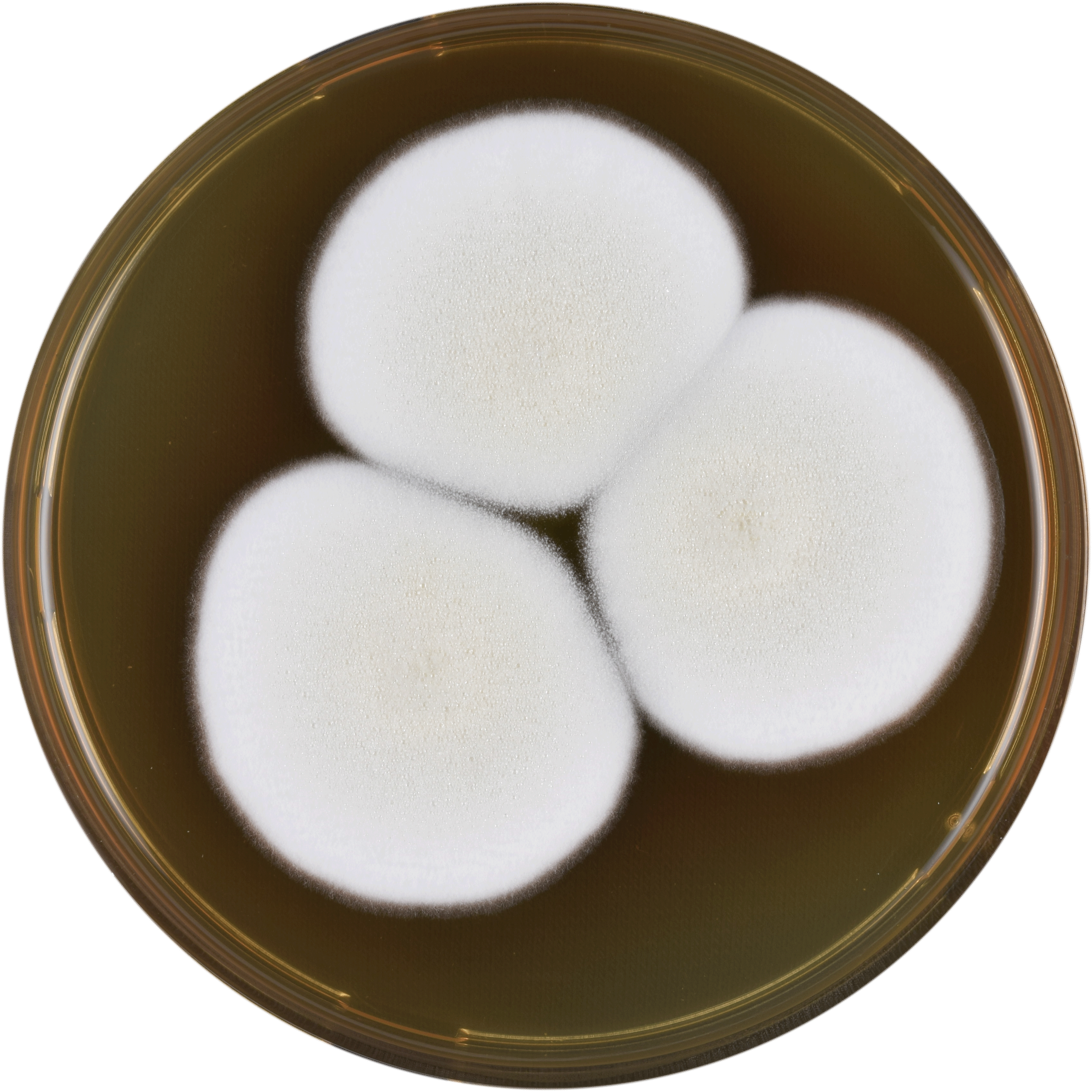
Aspergillus ferenczii growing on MEAOX plate
