= Aszonalenin =

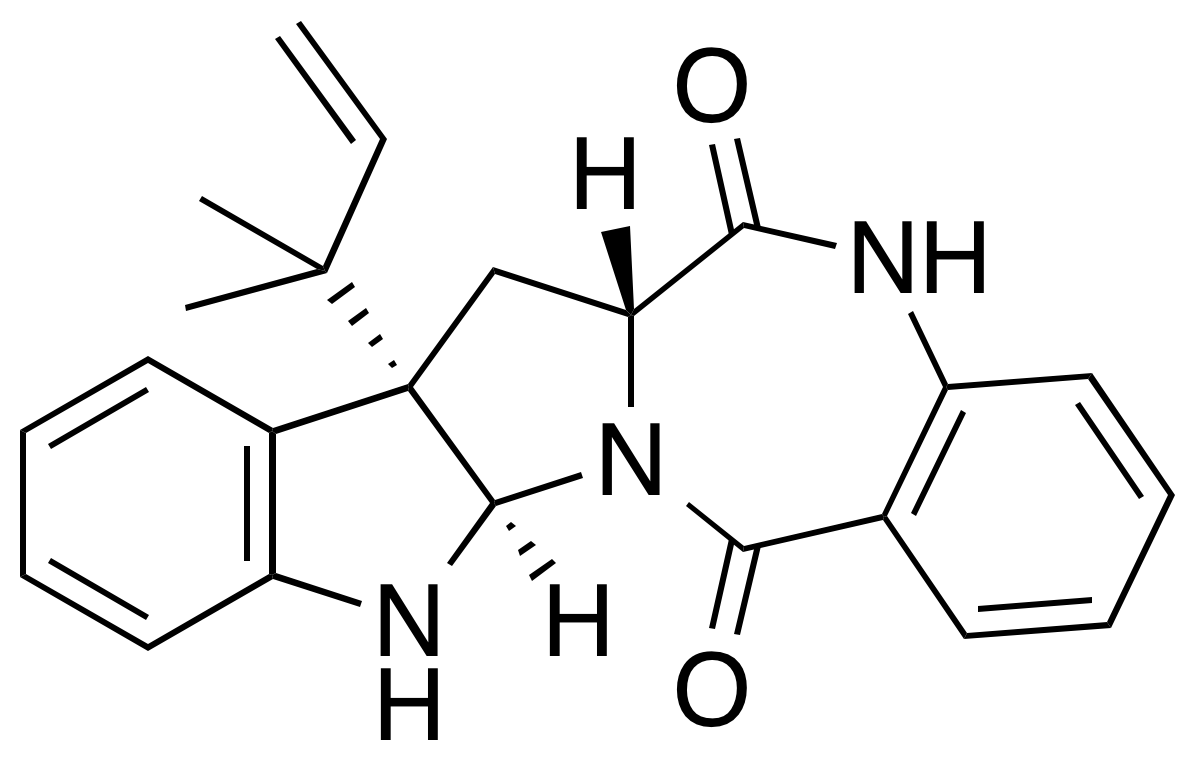

Names
- IUPAC name (2R,10S,12R)-10-(2-methylbut-3-en-2-yl)-1,3,14-triazapentacyclo[10.9.0.02,10.04,9.015,20]henicosa-4,6,8,15,17,19-hexaene-13,21-dione

Identifiers
CAS Number	81797-27-5
3D model (JSmol)	Interactive image
ChemSpider	28286412
PubChem CID	42636439
UNII	0V5DQ674AU
CompTox Dashboard (EPA)	DTXSID50398686
- InChI: InChI=1S/C23H23N3O2/c1-4-22(2,3)23-13-18-19(27)24-16-11-7-5-9-14(16)20(28)26(18)21(23)25-17-12-8-6-10-15(17)23/h4-12,18,21,25H,1,13H2,2-3H3,(H,24,27)/t18-,21-,23+/m1/s1 Key: AVLMMDWEIUEKEK-AAIMPIBUSA-N
- SMILES: CC(C)(C=C)[C@]12C[C@@H]3C(=O)NC4=CC=CC=C4C(=O)N3[C@H]1NC5=CC=CC=C25

Properties
Chemical formula	C_{23}H_{23}N_{3}O_{2}
Molar mass	373.456 g·mol^{−1}
- Except where otherwise noted, data are given for materials in their standard state (at 25 °C [77 °F], 100 kPa). Infobox references

Aszonalenin is an alkaloid which is produced by Neosartorya and Aspergillus species. Aszonalenin is a neurotoxin.
